= President John F. Kennedy Assassination Records Collection Act of 1992 =

Law passed by US Congress in 1992

- Other short titles: JFK Records Act
- Long title: An Act to provide for the expeditious disclosure of records relevant to the assassination of President John F. Kennedy.
- Nicknames: Kennedy Assassination (Open Files) Bill
- Enacted by: the 102nd United States Congress
- Effective: October 26, 1992; 34 years ago

Citations
- Public law: 102-526
- Statutes at Large: 106 Stat. 3443

Codification
- Titles amended: 44 U.S.C.: Public Printing and Documents
- U.S.C. sections amended: 44 U.S.C. ch. 21 § 2107

Legislative history
- Introduced in the Senate as S. 3006 by John H. Glenn, Jr. (D–OH) on July 22, 1992; Committee consideration by Senate Governmental Affairs; Passed the Senate on July 27, 1992 (passed voice vote); Passed the House on September 30, 1992 (passed without objection); Signed into law by President George H. W. Bush on October 26, 1992

Major amendments
- Pub. L. 103–345, 108 Stat. 3128, enacted October 6, 1994

The President John F. Kennedy Assassination Records Collection Act of 1992, or the JFK Records Act, is a public law passed by the United States Congress, effective October 26, 1992. It directed the National Archives and Records Administration (NARA) to establish a collection of records to be known as the President John F. Kennedy Assassination Records Collection. It stated that the collection shall consist of copies of all U.S. government records relating to the 1963 assassination of President John F. Kennedy, and that they are to be housed in the NARA Archives II building in College Park, Maryland. The collection also included any materials created or made available for use by, obtained by, or otherwise came into the possession of any state or local law enforcement office that provided support or assistance or performed work in connection with a federal inquiry into the assassination.

== Background ==
The final report of the act's Assassination Records Review Board (ARRB) partially credited the conclusions in Oliver Stone's 1991 film JFK with the passage of the act. The ARRB stated that the film "popularized a version of President Kennedy's assassination that featured U.S. government agents from the Federal Bureau of Investigation (FBI), the Central Intelligence Agency (CIA), and the military as conspirators."

== Requirements and process ==
The act requires that each assassination record be publicly disclosed in full and be made available in the collection no later than the date that is 25 years after the October 26, 1992 date of enactment (which was October 26, 2017), unless the president of the United States certifies that: (1) continued postponement is made necessary by an identifiable harm to the military defense, intelligence operations, law enforcement, or conduct of foreign relations; and (2) the identifiable harm is of such gravity that it outweighs the public interest in disclosure.

The definition of "assassination record" was left broad by the act and determined in practice by the ARRB; a final definition was published in the Federal Register on June 28, 1995. The basic definition was:

An assassination record includes, but is not limited to, all records, public and private, regardless of how labeled or identified, that document, describe, report on, analyze, or interpret activities, persons, or events reasonably related to the assassination of President John F. Kennedy and investigations of or inquiries into the assassination.

This was supplemented with coverage of all government records relating to investigations of the assassination (including those specified in Section 3(2) of the act), as well as supplementary records required to clarify meanings of other documents (such as code names used).

The ARRB determined that agencies could not object to disclosure "solely on grounds of non-relevance," stating that the ARRB is responsible for making decisions that determine relevance.

== Assassination Records Review Board ==
The act established, as an independent agency, the Assassination Records Review Board (ARRB), to consider and render decisions when a U.S. government office sought to postpone the disclosure of assassination records. The board met for four years, from October 1, 1994, to September 30, 1998. When the act was passed in 1992, 98 percent of all Warren Commission documents had been released to the public. By the time the board disbanded, all Warren Commission documents, except income tax returns, had been released to the public, with only minor redactions.

The ARRB collected evidence starting in 1992, then produced its final report in 1998. The ARRB was not enacted to determine why or by whom the murder was committed but to collect and preserve the evidence for public scrutiny. After the enactment of the federal law that created the ARRB, the board collected a large number of documents and took testimony of those who had relevant information of the events. The committee finished its work in 1998 and in its final report, the ARRB outlined the problems that government secrecy created regarding the murder of President Kennedy.

Some of the information was gathered by way of testimony from witnesses that had eyewitness knowledge of the events. For example, the board interviewed the physicians who treated the president's massive head wound at Parkland Hospital in Dallas. This was a highly trained team of emergency care physicians, some of whom testified in secret before the Warren Commission. These transcripts have now also been made public. Other information consists of a large number of documents from the FBI and CIA that were required to cooperate with the turnover of relevant records held secret by these agencies.

A staff report for the Assassinations Records Review Board contended that brain photographs in the Kennedy records are not of Kennedy's brain and show much less damage than Kennedy sustained. J. Thornton Boswell, who, along with James Humes did a secondary examination of Kennedy's brain, refuted these allegations. The board also found that, conflicting with the photographic images showing no such defect, a number of witnesses, including at both the Autopsy and Parkland hospital, saw a large wound in the back of the president's head. The board and board member Jeremy Gunn have also stressed the problems with witness testimony, asking people to weigh all of the evidence, with due concern for human error, rather than take single statements as "proof" for one theory or another.

=== Refusal to provide records ===
The ARRB sought the files of Jim Garrison, who had brought Clay Shaw to trial for the murder of President Kennedy in 1969. Garrison's successor as district attorney, Harry Connick Sr., in 1995 promised to the ARRB and at a public meeting in New Orleans that he would donate the Garrison investigative files, which were still in his office. According to the review board's final report, Connick instructed one of his investigators, Gary Raymond, to destroy these documents after he took office. Raymond took them home instead and kept them because he did not feel right about burning the records, stating, "It's not every day you are assigned to burn the records of investigations into the assassination of a president." When he found out about the review board in 1995, he gave the records to television reporter Richard Angelico for Angelico to deliver the records to Congress, stating, "When Congress asks for all documents, they mean all documents." A battle ensued between Connick and the Review Board after Connick demanded that the papers were returned to him and threatening to withhold the investigation papers. After many subpoenas going both ways, and with the help of the U.S. Department of Justice, the Review Board won and all of the documents in question are in the JFK Collection.

In January 1995 the Secret Service destroyed presidential protection survey reports for some of President Kennedy's trips in Autumn 1963. The ARRB discovered this a week later.

=== Status ===
By ARRB law (of 1998), all existing assassination-related documents were to be made public by October 2017. Prior to October 2017, over 35,000 documents were still not fully available (partially redacted) to the public, and among them, 3,603 were at that time unseen by the public.

In 2013, the ARRB's former chairman John R. Tunheim and former deputy director Thomas Samoluk wrote in the Boston Globe that after the ARRB had declassified 5 million documents, "There is a body of documents that the CIA is still protecting, which should be released. Relying on inaccurate representations made by the CIA in the mid-1990s, the Review Board decided that records related to a deceased CIA agent named George Joannides were not relevant to the assassination. Subsequent work by researchers, using other records that were released by the board, demonstrates that these records should be made public." Tunheim and Samoluk pointed out that the CIA had not told the Warren Commission that George Joannides was the CIA lead for the Agency's links with the anti-Castro group with whom Oswald had a public fight in mid-1963; nor had they told the United States House Select Committee on Assassinations (HSCA), of which Joannides was the CIA's liaison. Tunheim said in a separate interview that "It really was an example of treachery ... If [the CIA] fooled us on that, they may have fooled us on other things."

=== 2017 releases ===
On July 24, 2017, the National Archives began to release the remaining documents previously withheld.

The first release included 441 FBI and CIA records which had previously been withheld in full. These records had never previously been made available to the public. Another 3,369 records were also released which had previously been withheld in part, meaning that they had previously been made public, but parts of the records had been kept back for reasons of security or privacy. Records in the first release included 17 audio files of interviews of Yuri Nosenko, a KGB officer who claimed to have been the officer in charge of the KGB file on Lee Harvey Oswald during Oswald's stay in the Soviet Union. Nosenko defected to the U.S. in January 1964 and was extensively debriefed over a period of several years.

On October 21, 2017, US president Donald Trump stated on his Twitter account that he would allow release of the remaining documents. He tweeted: "Subject to the receipt of further information, I will be allowing, as President, the long blocked and classified JFK FILES to be opened." His statement left open the possibility that some documents could still be withheld under the JFK Records Act if their release would harm military operations, law enforcement or foreign relations.

On October 26, Trump signed a memo ordering release of all records collected under section 5 of the JFK Records Act. He gave agencies wishing to appeal release of all information in these records until April 26, 2018, to do so.

On the same day, the NARA released another 2,891 records. Most of the records in this second release were previously withheld in part.

On November 3, the NARA released another 676 documents. Most of these were previously withheld in full. According to the Mary Ferrell Foundation, which holds a large database of records on the assassination, the majority of the records in this third release were from the CIA. These files still contain a number of redactions, which remain subject to further review under President Trump's order.

On November 9, the NARA released another 13,213 records. Most of these were previously withheld in part. According to the Mary Ferrell Foundation, the records in this fourth release were from the CIA and NSA. Some of these records were redacted in part. These redactions remain subject to further review under President Trump's order.

On November 17, the NARA released another 10,744 records, including 144 previously withheld in full and 10,600 previously withheld in part. All of the records in this fifth release were from the FBI. Some of these records were redacted in part. These redactions remain subject to further review under President Trump's order.

On December 15, the NARA released another 3,539 previously withheld documents, leaving a total of 86 still classified in full.

=== Later releases ===
On April 26, 2018, the NARA released another 19,045 documents in accordance with President Trump's order. These releases include FBI, CIA, and other agency documents (both formerly withheld in part and formerly withheld in full) identified by the Assassination Records Review Board as assassination records. While no more documents required to be released under section 5 remain withheld in full, some still remain withheld in part.

In 2021, President Joe Biden postponed the release of remaining records, citing the COVID-19 pandemic as the reason. Future releases of documents were scheduled for December 15, 2021, and December 15, 2022. Agencies that object to releasing records before then will have to provide unclassified information detailing why the information is withheld, and a date when the information might be declassified. The initial response to the 2021 release was that it provided little new information.

On December 15, 2022, NARA released an additional 13,173 documents as ordered by President Biden.

In June 2023, it was reported that NARA had completed the review of the documents with 99% of all documents having been made public. According to The New York Times, as of 2023, 4684 documents are still "fully or partially withheld" from the public.

On January 23, 2025, President Trump signed Executive Order 14176 to declassify documents concerning Kennedy's assassination, as well as those regarding the assassination of his brother Robert F. Kennedy and Martin Luther King Jr. More than 60,000 documents were released two months later on March 18.

- On March 18, 2025, at 7 PM EST, NARA released 32,000 pages in 1,123 PDF files
- On March 18, 2025, at 10:30 PM EST, NARA released 31,400 pages in 1,059 PDF files
- On March 20, 2025, at 9:30 PM EST, NARA released 13,700 pages in 161 PDF files
- From March 18, 2025, to March 20, 2025, the NARA released 77,100 pages in 2343 PDF files (7.049 gigabytes)

"As the records continue to be digitized, they will be posted to this page."

The records reveal further how much the Central Intelligence Agency observed Lee Harvey Oswald before the shooting. A note by Arthur M. Schlesinger Jr. shows the Central Intelligence Agency's huge presence in US embassies, even in France. A BBC News Online report on March 20, 2025 states that Jefferson Morley, a former Washington Post reporter, "said there are further documents in the National Archives yet to be released, and others held by the CIA and FBI that have not yet been accounted for".

In July 2025, new documents were released that indicated the involvement of George Joannides, a Miami-based CIA officer, in a student group organized against Cuban leader Fidel Castro that had previously come into contact with Oswald months before the JFK assassination.

== See also ==
- Henry Graff, Member of the ARRB
- Kermit L. Hall, Member of the ARRB
- John R. Tunheim, Chairman of the ARRB
- David Marwell, Executive Director of the ARRB
- QKENCHANT, a CIA project, first disclosed because of JFK Records Act
