= RFK Must Die =

- DVD cover
- Directed by: Shane O'Sullivan
- Produced by: Shane O'Sullivan
- Starring: Robert F. Kennedy; Sirhan Sirhan; Munir Sirhan; Sandra Serrano; Paul Schrade; Evan Freed; Vincent Di Pierro
- Cinematography: George Dougherty
- Edited by: Shane O'Sullivan
- Music by: Pyratek
- Distributed by: Soda Pictures
- Release dates: 20 November 2007 (United States); 16 May 2008 (United Kingdom)
- Running time: 102 minutes
- Country: United Kingdom

RFK Must Die: The Assassination of Bobby Kennedy is a 2007 investigative documentary by Irish writer and filmmaker Shane O'Sullivan. The film expands on O'Sullivan's earlier reports for BBC Newsnight and The Guardian and explores conspiracy theories related to the assassination of United States Senator Robert F. Kennedy on 5 June 1968. The title comes from a page of "free writing" found in assassin Sirhan Sirhan's notebook after the shooting upon which Sirhan had written "R.F.K. must die - RFK must be killed Robert F. Kennedy must be assassinated ... before June 5 '68."

== Background ==
U.S. presidential candidate Robert F. Kennedy had just won the California Democratic primary and was confident that he would challenge Richard Nixon for the White House. After a victory speech in a ballroom at the Ambassador Hotel in Los Angeles, he was shot while walking through the hotel's kitchen pantry, fatally wounded by a bullet to the brain that was fired from an inch behind his right ear.

Twenty-four-year-old Palestinian-American Sirhan Sirhan was convicted of murder as the lone assassin. The film investigates claims that witnesses placed Sirhan several feet in front of Kennedy and that Sirhan claims to not remember the shooting. Defense psychiatrist Bernard L. Diamond testified that Sirhan was in a hypnotic state at the time of the shooting. FBI agent William Bailey saw extra bullet holes in the pantry, suggesting that a second gunman may have been involved.

== Plot ==
The film features many interviews, including one with Sirhan's younger brother Munir, who talks about his brother's upbringing and perceived injustices. Other interviewees include Paul Schrade (a union leader who was shot during the assassination), Sandra Serrano (a witness who saw two people gleefully running out of the Ambassador Hotel after the shooting) and Vincent diPierro (a witness to the assassination). Lengthy audio clips are also provided that attest to Serrano's forceful manipulation at the hands of Los Angeles police sergeant Hank Hernandez and Sirhan's extreme suggestibility to hypnosis.

O'Sullivan identifies a possible second assassin, armed security guard Thane Eugene Cesar, who was immediately behind Kennedy at the time of the shooting and sold his gun soon after under mysterious circumstances. (Note: Also named by researcher Greg Stone.) An attempt is also made to identify several figures appearing in news footage from the night of the assassination as CIA operatives who may have had a role in the assassination. The short film RFK Must Die: Epilogue details a recent audio analysis that concluded that 13 shots were fired, suggesting the possibility of a second shooter.

== Release ==
After a three-year investigation, RFK Must Die was released theatrically in the United Kingdom on 16 May 2008 and in New York on 5 June 2008, the 40th anniversary of the assassination.

In November 2006, BBC Television's Newsnight aired a 12-minute screening of the documentary.

== Response ==
O'Sullivan has stated that while researching a screenplay based on the Manchurian candidate theory of the assassination of Robert Kennedy, he "uncovered new video and photographic evidence suggesting that three senior CIA operatives were behind the killing." He claimed that three men seen in video and photographs of the Ambassador Hotel immediately before and after the assassination were positively identified as CIA operatives David Sánchez Morales, Gordon Campbell and George Joannides.

However, several people who had known Morales, including family members, were adamant that he was not the man whom O'Sullivan had claimed was Morales. After O'Sullivan published his book, assassination researchers Jefferson Morley and David Talbot discovered that Campbell had died of a heart attack in 1962, six years prior to the assassination of Kennedy. In response, O'Sullivan stated that the man on the video may have used Campbell's name as an alias. He then took his identifications to the Los Angeles Police Department, whose files showed that the men whom he had identified as Campbell and Joannides were in truth Michael Roman and Frank Owens, two Bulova sales managers attending a convention at the Ambassador. O'Sullivan stood by his allegations, stating that the Bulova watch company was a "well-known CIA cover."

== See also ==
- Robert F. Kennedy in media
