= Robert F. Kennedy in media =

Robert F. Kennedy, the 64th United States Attorney General, a U.S. senator from New York, and the brother of United States president John F. Kennedy, has frequently been depicted or referenced in works of popular culture.

== Documentaries ==
Robert Drew's 1963 documentary Crisis: Behind a Presidential Commitment focused on Governor George Wallace's Stand in the Schoolhouse Door at the University of Alabama.

Documentary filmmaker DA Pennebaker made several films featuring Kennedy. His short film Jingle Bells (1964) follows Kennedy and his children as they celebrate Christmas in New York City with local school children and Sammy Davis Jr. His later film Hickory Hill documents the 1968 Annual Spring Pet Show at Hickory Hill, the Kennedy Virginia estate.

Robert Kennedy Remembered (1968), by Charles Guggenheim, honored Kennedy soon after his death.

In 1970, ABC-TV presented David L. Wolper's film The Unfinished Journey of Robert F. Kennedy, narrated by John Huston.

In 1973, Gérard Alcan directed and produced The Second Gun, a film about Kennedy's murder.

Shane O' Sullivan's 2007 documentary RFK Must Die: The Assassination of Bobby Kennedy investigates the assassination and conspiracy theories surrounding it.

The documentary film, A Ripple of Hope (2008), retells Kennedy's call for peace during a campaign stop in Indianapolis, on April 4, 1968, the evening of the assassination of Martin Luther King Jr.

The documentary film, RFK in the Land of Apartheid: A Ripple of Hope (2010), follows his five-day visit to South Africa in June 1966, during which he made his famous Ripple of Hope speech at the University of Cape Town.

The documentary film, Ethel (2012), about the life of Ethel Kennedy, recounts many of the major personal and political events of Kennedy's life, through interviews with family members including Ethel herself, and news footage.

In 2018, Netflix released the 4-part documentary Bobby Kennedy for President that focused on his political rise and brief campaign for president in 1968.

== Films and television ==
Kennedy's role in the Cuban Missile Crisis has been dramatized by Martin Sheen in the TV play The Missiles of October (1974) and by Steven Culp in Thirteen Days (2000).

He is portrayed by John Shea in the TV miniseries Kennedy (1983).

Cliff DeYoung portrayed RFK in the 1978 Miniseries King.

He is portrayed by Cotter Smith in the television miniseries Blood Feud (1983).

He is portrayed by Brad Davis in the three-part TV mini-series Robert Kennedy and His Times (1985), based on the book by Arthur M. Schlesinger Jr.

The 1985 film Prince Jack portrays Attorney General Kennedy's (James F. Kelly) efforts to address the Civil rights movement.

He is portrayed by Nicholas Campbell in the television mini-series Hoover vs. The Kennedys (1987).

He was portrayed by Kevin Anderson in Hoffa (1992) and by Željko Ivanek in the HBO film The Rat Pack (1998).

He is played by Linus Roache in the made-for-TV movie RFK (2002), which portrays his life from the time of his brother's assassination to his own death.

The film Bobby (2006) is the story of multiple people's lives leading up to RFK's assassination. The film employs stock footage from his presidential campaign, and he is briefly portrayed by Dave Fraunces.

Barry Pepper won an Emmy for his portrayal of Kennedy in The Kennedys (2011), an 8-part miniseries.

In the biographical movie J. Edgar (2011), RFK is played by Jeffrey Donovan.

He was played by Russell Lucas in Seven Days That Made a President (2013).

Jack Noseworthy plays Robert Kennedy in the 2013 film Killing Kennedy.

He is played by Peter Sarsgaard in the film about Jacqueline Kennedy, Jackie (2016).

He is played by Julian Ovenden in the TV series The Crown in the episode "Dear Mrs Kennedy" (2017).

He is played by Jack Huston in Martin Scorsese's film The Irishman (2019).

== Other arts, entertainment, and media ==
=== Music ===
The Rolling Stones began recording the song "Sympathy for the Devil" on June 4, 1968. The original lyrics included the line, "I shouted out 'Who killed Kennedy?'", which was changed to, "I shouted out 'Who killed the Kennedys?'"

The 1968 song "Abraham, Martin and John" is a tribute to Abraham Lincoln, Martin Luther King Jr., John F. Kennedy and Robert F. Kennedy.

The song "Starlight" by Taylor Swift on her 2012 album Red is about the courtship of Robert F. Kennedy and his wife Ethel.

=== Novels ===
James Ellroy wrote a fictionalized historical version of Robert F. Kennedy in his Underworld USA Trilogy novels. He is an important secondary character, and appears in two of the three novels in the trilogy: American Tabloid (1995) and The Cold Six Thousand (2001).

=== Plays ===
British playwright Roy Smiles' play about Kennedy's 1968 presidential campaign, The Last Pilgrim, was staged in London in 2010. It was nominated for the 2011 Offie for Best Play.

Robert F. Kennedy is the inspiration behind British theatre maker Russell Lucas's 'The Bobby Kennedy Experience', directed by Sarah-Louise Young.

=== Poetry ===
Robert Lowell wrote several poems about Kennedy; his elegy for him includes the line, "doom was woven in your nerves".

== See also ==
- Cultural depictions of John F. Kennedy
- Cultural depictions of Jacqueline Kennedy Onassis
