= David Sánchez Morales =

American spy (1925–1978)

David Sánchez Morales (August 26, 1925 – May 8, 1978) was a Central Intelligence Agency operative who worked in Cuba and Chile.

== Biographical highlights ==
Morales, of Mexican descent, spent his early life in Phoenix, Arizona, and attended school at Arizona State College in Tempe (now Arizona State University) and the University of Southern California in Los Angeles before joining the Army in 1946. He served in the 82nd Airborne, and was recruited into US Army intelligence during that time. Morales maintained an Army 'cover' even after joining the Central Intelligence Agency in 1951. He was nicknamed "El Indio" owing to his dark skin and Native Indian appearance.

Shortly after joining the CIA, Morales became an operative for the CIA's Directorate for Plans. It is alleged that he was involved in Executive Action, a series of projects designed to kill foreign leaders deemed unfriendly to the United States. Morales reportedly was involved in Operation PBSuccess, the CIA covert operation that overthrew the democratically elected President of Guatemala, Jacobo Arbenz Guzmán. He served in Cuba from 1958-1960 in the American consulate in Havana.

Through the 1960s and mid-1970s, Morales was involved at top levels in a variety of covert projects, including JMWAVE, the ZRRIFLE plot to assassinate Fidel Castro, the Bay of Pigs Invasion operation, the CIA's secret war in Laos, the capture of Che Guevara, and the overthrow of Salvador Allende.

== Allegations of involvement with the Kennedy assassinations ==
=== John F. Kennedy ===
After the death of E. Howard Hunt in 2007, John Hunt and David Hunt revealed that their father had recorded several claims about himself and others being involved in a conspiracy to assassinate John F. Kennedy. In the April 5, 2007 issue of Rolling Stone, John Hunt detailed a number of individuals implicated by his father including Morales, as well as Lyndon B. Johnson, Cord Meyer, David Atlee Phillips, Frank Sturgis, William Harvey and an assassin he termed "French gunman grassy knoll" who some presume was Lucien Sarti. (Lucien Sarti was in prison in France at the time of the assassination, but Corsican hit man, Jean Souetre, who came to New York on Nov 19, 1963 and then left the country from Laredo, Texas on Dec 6 is thought more likely to be the “Sarte” or “Satre” mentioned in Hunt's son's book as the Corsican assassin allegedly contracted for "the big event".)

The two sons alleged that their father cut the information from his memoirs, "American Spy: My Secret History in the CIA, Watergate and Beyond", to avoid possible perjury charges. According to Hunt's widow and other children, the two sons took advantage of Hunt's loss of lucidity by coaching and exploiting him for financial gain.

Morales' friend, Ruben Carbajal, claimed that in 1973 Morales opened up about his involvement with the Bay of Pigs Invasion operation, and stated that "Kennedy had been responsible for him having to watch all the men he recruited and trained get wiped out." Carbajal claimed that Morales said, "Well, we took care of that SOB, didn't we?"

Morales is alleged to have once told friends, "I was in Dallas when we got the son of a bitch, and I was in Los Angeles when we got the little bastard". presumably referring to the assassination of President Kennedy in Dallas, Texas, and to the later assassination of Senator Robert F. Kennedy in Los Angeles, California, on June 5, 1968. Morales is alleged to have expressed deep anger toward the Kennedys for what he saw as their betrayal during the Bay of Pigs Invasion.

=== Robert F. Kennedy ===
In November 2006, BBC Television's Newsnight aired a twelve-minute screening of Shane O'Sullivan's documentary RFK Must Die. O'Sullivan stated that while researching a screenplay based on the Manchurian candidate theory for the assassination of Robert Kennedy, he "uncovered new video and photographic evidence suggesting that three senior CIA operatives were behind the killing". He claimed that three men seen in video and photographs of the Ambassador Hotel immediately before and after the assassination were positively identified as CIA operatives Gordon Campbell, George Joannides, and Morales. Several people who had known Morales, including family members, were adamant that he was not the man who O'Sullivan said was Morales. After O'Sullivan published his book, assassination researchers Jefferson Morley and David Talbot also discovered that Campbell had died of a heart attack in 1962, six years prior to the assassination of Kennedy. In response, O'Sullivan stated that the man on the video may have used Campbell's name as an alias. He then took his identifications to the Los Angeles Police Department whose files showed the men he identified as Campbell and Joannides to be Michael Roman and Frank Owens, two Bulova sales managers attending the company's convention in the Ambassador. O'Sullivan stood by his allegations stating that the Bulova watch company was a "well-known CIA cover".
