= Evan Freed =

American lawyer

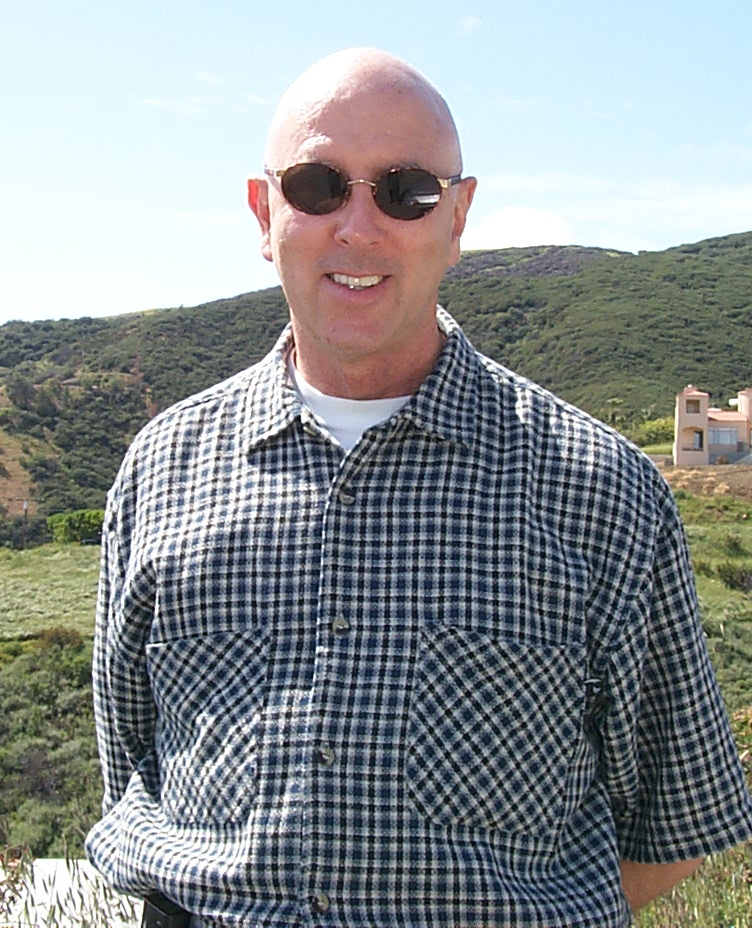
- Born: Evan Phillip Freed; September 11, 1946 (age 79); Los Angeles, California, U.S.
- Occupations: attorney, photographer
- Known for: association with Robert F. Kennedy

Evan Phillip Freed (born September 11, 1946) is an attorney and freelance photographer who traveled with and photographed the presidential campaign of United States Senator Robert F. Kennedy. Freed was present when Sirhan Sirhan shot Kennedy.

== Life and education ==
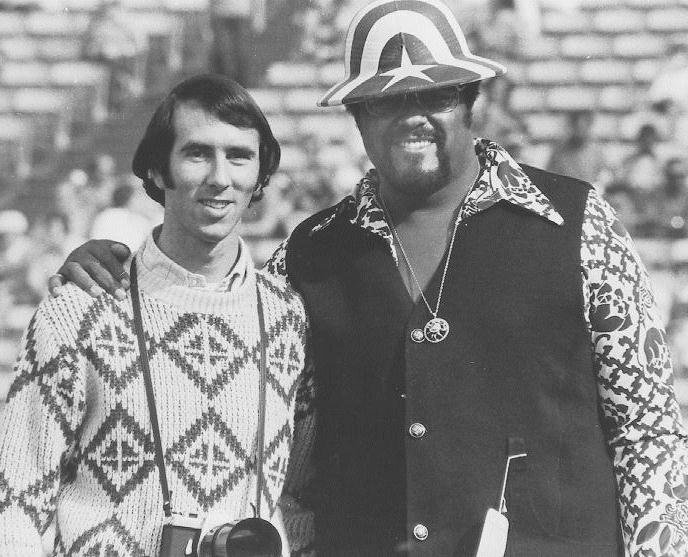
Freed (left), with Roosevelt Grier, 1967

Evan Freed was born in Los Angeles, California. He graduated from California State University, Los Angeles and University of West Los Angeles School of Law.

== Robert F. Kennedy assassination ==
Freed photographed Kennedy's presidential campaign. At the time of the assassination, Freed had stepped into the pantry area behind the Embassy Ballroom of the Ambassador Hotel (Los Angeles) to repair his damaged camera. He heard shots and immediately saw Sirhan Sirhan firing a revolver toward Senator Kennedy. Freed was then pressed against the wall by a crush of bodies. He watched the struggle to subdue Sirhan, and saw two men and a woman running for the exit at the east end of the pantry. Kennedy campaign worker Sandy Serrano reported seeing a girl in a polka dot dress running from the scene with a man accompanying her, and claimed that the girl exclaimed, "We shot him! We shot him!" When asked to whom the girl was referring, Serrano reported that the girl said, "We shot Senator Kennedy!" Evan Freed also saw the girl in the polka dot dress, who is linked to Robert F. Kennedy assassination conspiracy theories. Freed appeared in Shane O'Sullivan's 2007 documentary RFK Must Die.

Freed's testimony has been cited in support of Robert F. Kennedy assassination conspiracy theories.

== Later years ==
In 1979 Freed was admitted to practice law by the State Bar of California. From 1982 to 1987 Freed was employed by the Los Angeles County Public Defender as a criminal defense attorney. In 1987 he joined the Law Offices of the Alternate Defense Counsel in Los Angeles where he worked until 1995.

In 1995 Freed was hired by the Los Angeles City Attorney as a criminal prosecutor. While employed there Freed provided information to the United States Attorney used in a police corruption case, in which an indictment was handed down while authorities continued to probe allegations of misconduct, criminality and civil rights violations in the Los Angeles Police Department.

Freed left the Los Angeles City Attorney's office in 1997 and is now a criminal defense lawyer in Redondo Beach, California. A notable case was Freed's defense of a young driver involved in a fatal accident. Freed contended that glare and not a dirty windshield was the cause of the accident. The case was settled with a plea bargain. In another case, Freed obtained a reduced federal court sentence for a man convicted of rhino horn trafficking. Freed represented one defendant in the 2015 Rowland Heights, California bullying incident, who received a 13-year sentence in a plea bargain.

== Evan Freed's Robert F. Kennedy photos ==
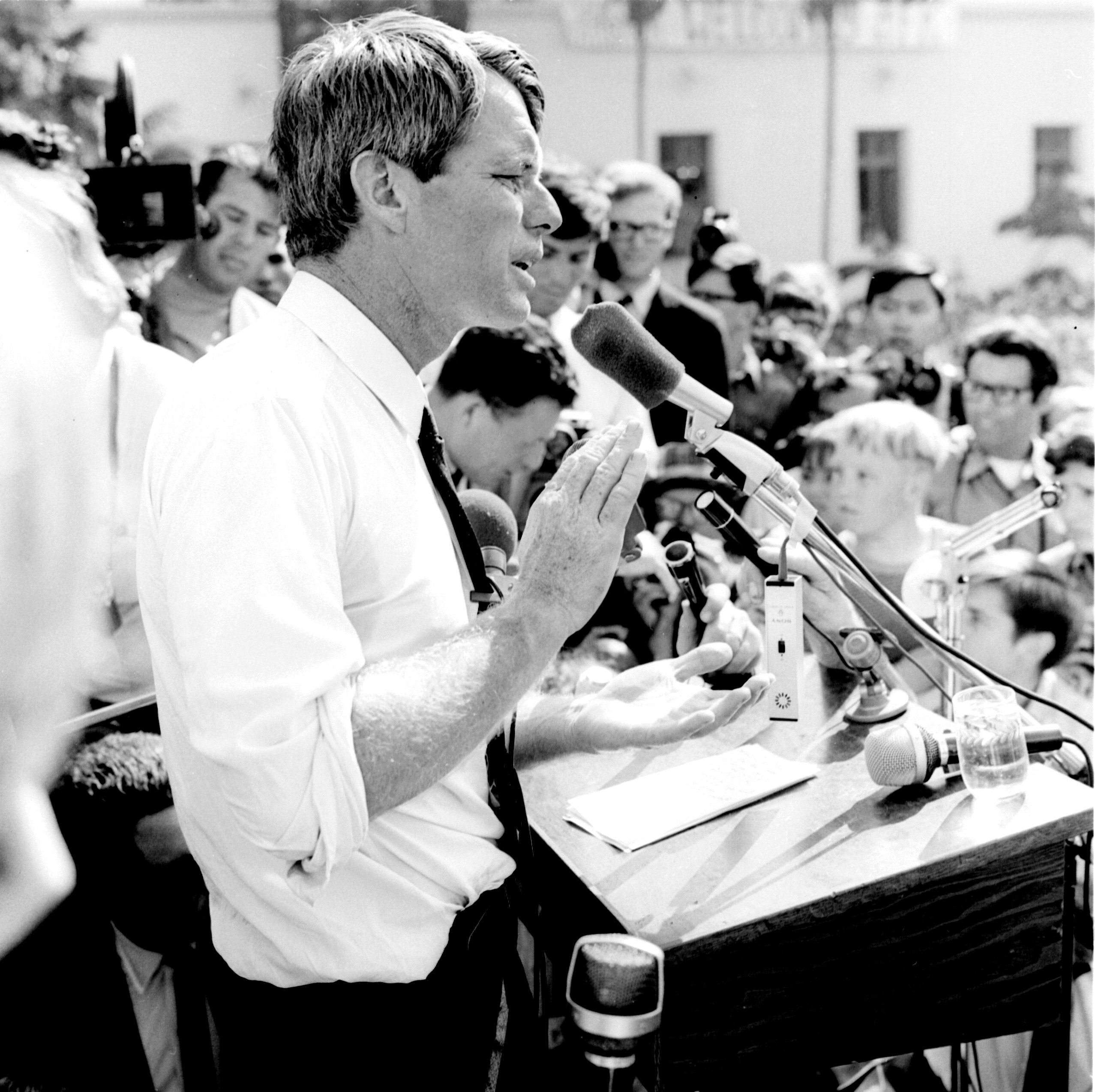
Robert F. Kennedy, Los Angeles 1968

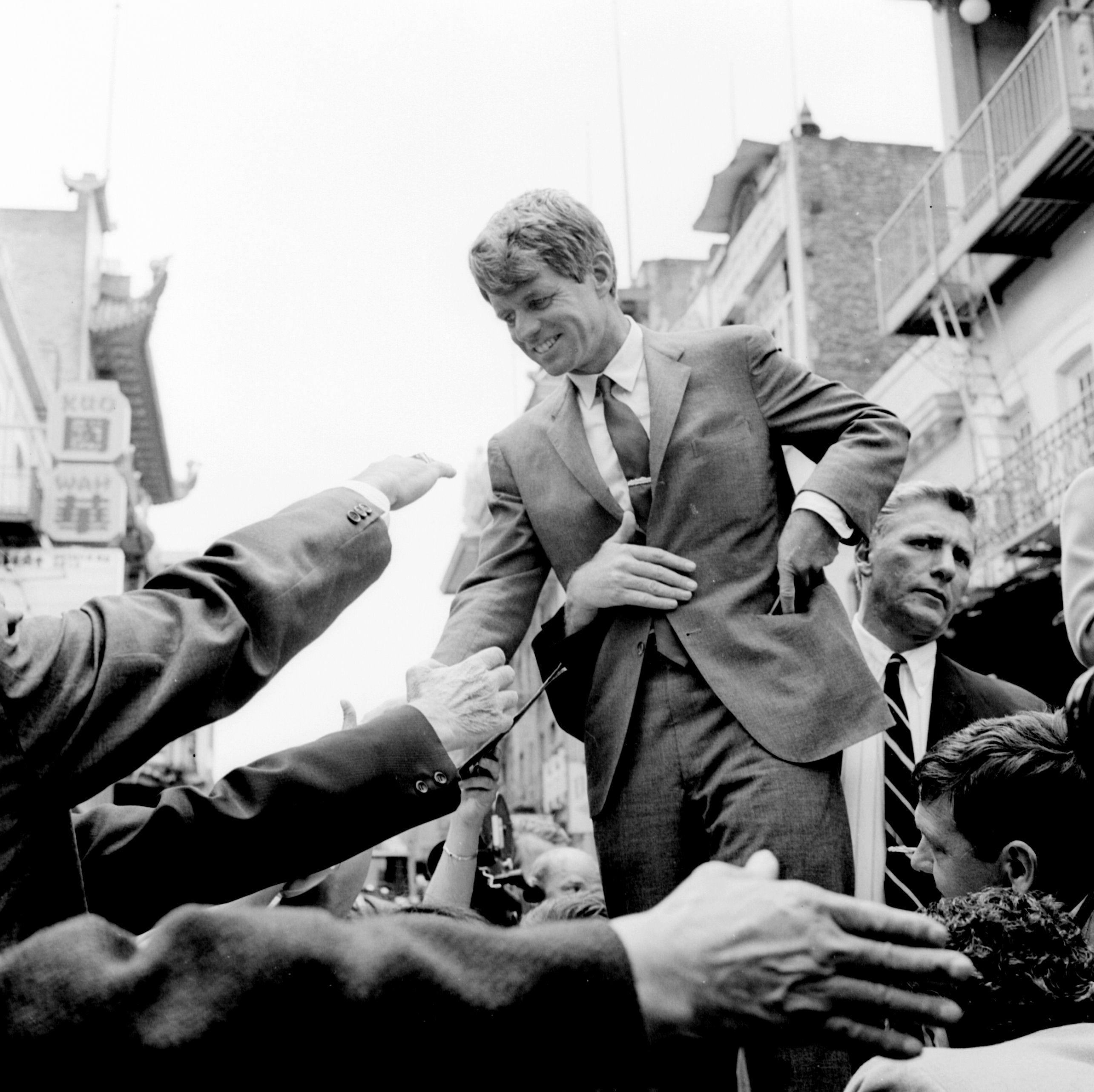
Robert Kennedy, San Francisco 1968

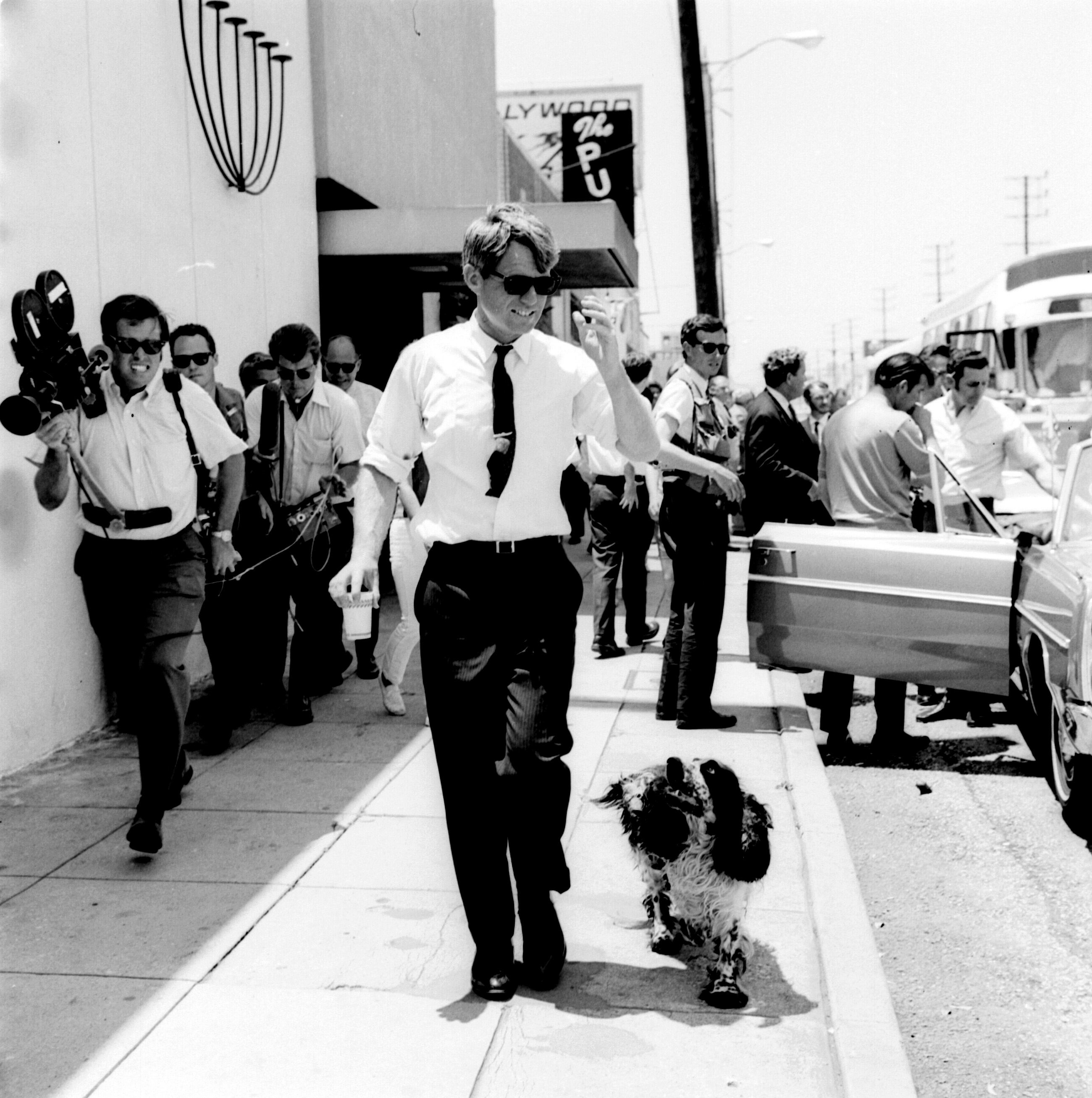
Robert Kennedy, Los Angeles 1968

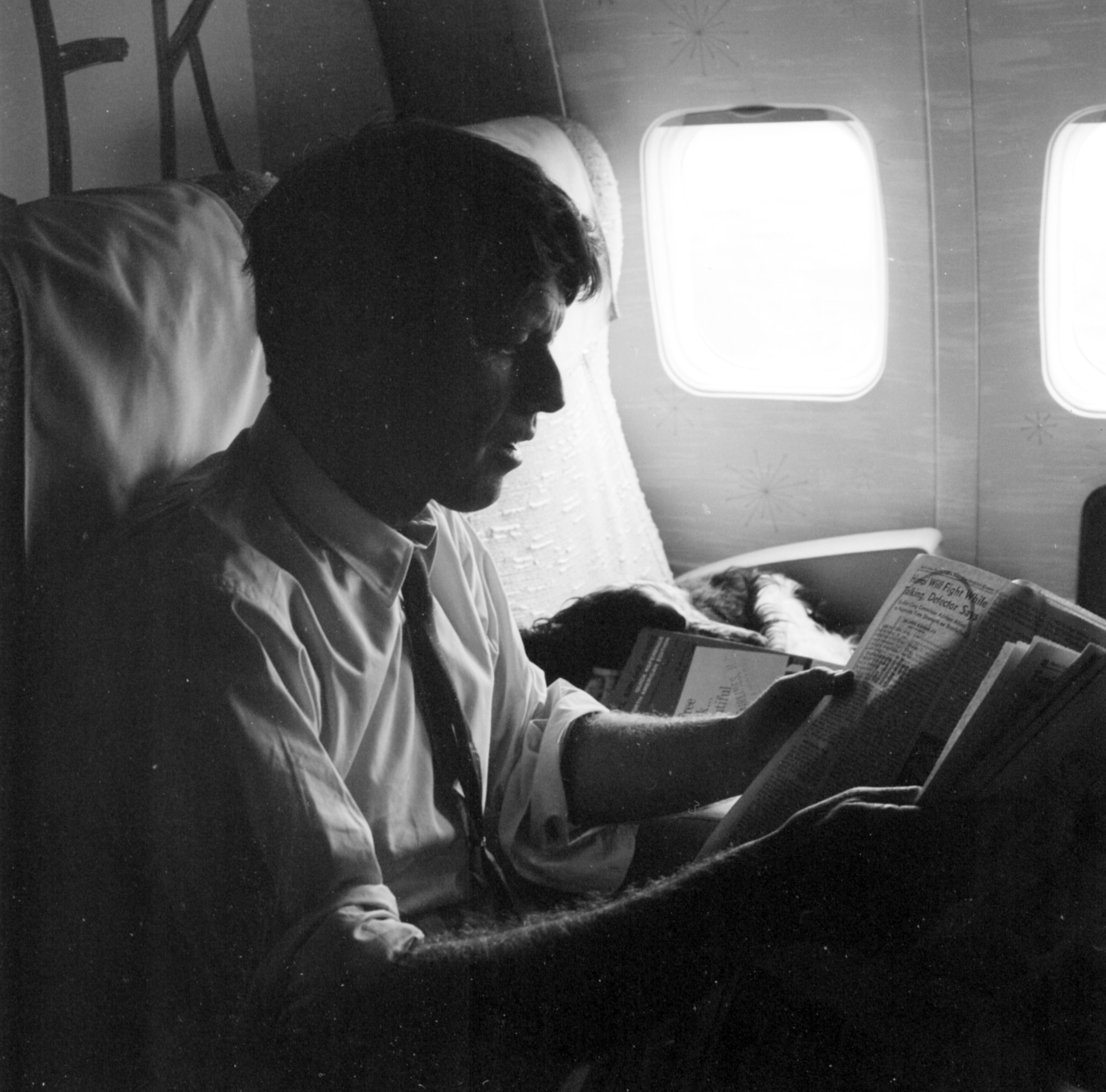
Robert Kennedy, Campaign plane 1968
