= Robert F. Kennedy assassination conspiracy theories =

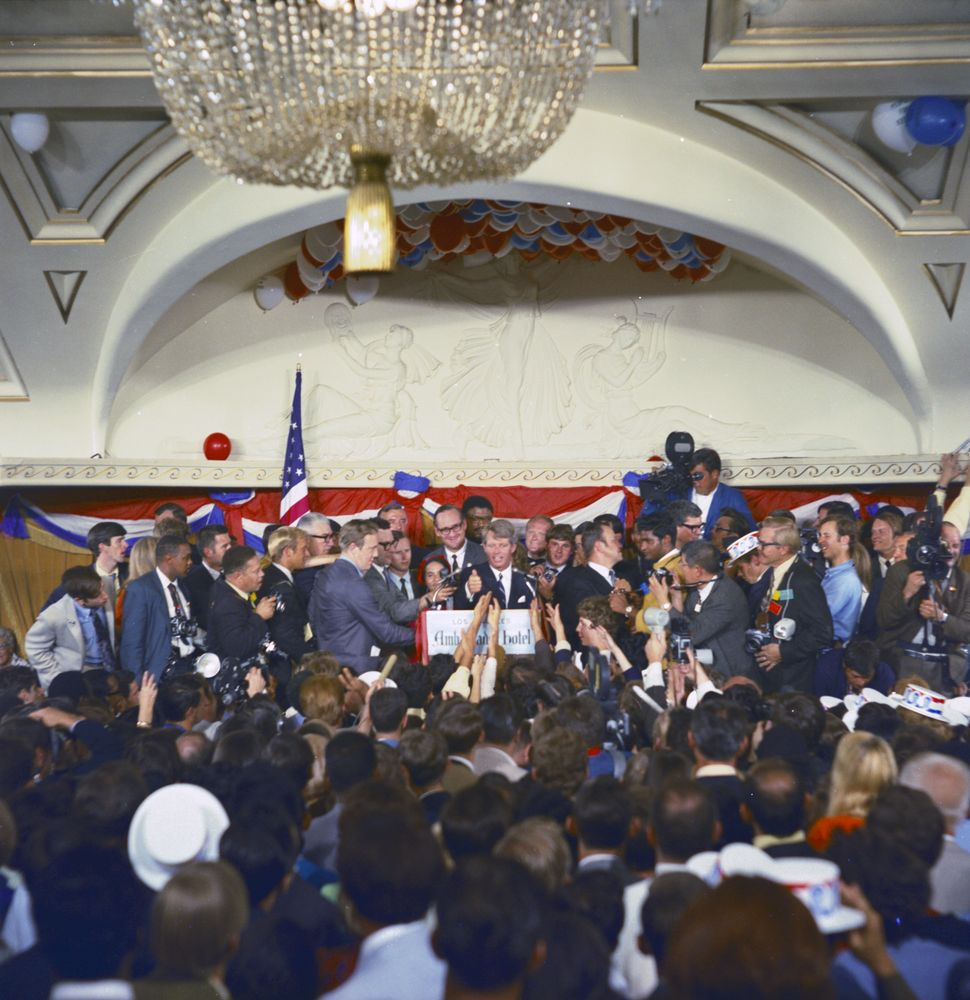
Robert F. Kennedy addressing supporters in the Embassy Ballroom of the Ambassador Hotel, shortly before his assassination

U.S. senator and Democratic presidential candidate Robert F. Kennedy was shot shortly after midnight on June 5, 1968, at the Ambassador Hotel in Los Angeles, during celebrations following his successful campaign in California's primary elections as a leading 1968 Democratic presidential candidate; he died the following day at Good Samaritan Hospital.

Palestinian immigrant Sirhan Sirhan was arrested at the scene of the shooting and later convicted of the murder. But as with the controversy surrounding the assassination of his brother, John, Robert Kennedy's assassination and the circumstances surrounding it have spawned various conspiracy theories, particularly about a second gunman and whether Sirhan was the actual killer. Such theories have also centered on a woman wearing a polka-dot dress claiming responsibility for the crime, and the involvement of the Central Intelligence Agency.

Many of these theories were examined during an investigation ordered by the United States Senate and were judged to be erroneous by the Federal Bureau of Investigation, which investigated on the Senate's behalf.

== Second gunman theory ==
=== Wounds ===
The location of Kennedy's wounds suggested that his assailant had stood behind him, but witnesses said that Sirhan stood facing west, about a yard away from Kennedy as he moved through the pantry facing east. This has led to the suggestion that a second gunman actually fired the fatal shot, a possibility supported by Chief Medical Examiner-Coroner for the County of Los Angeles Thomas Noguchi. Noguchi performed Kennedy's autopsy and said the fatal shot was behind Kennedy's right ear and had been fired at a distance of approximately one inch. Other witnesses said that as Sirhan approached, Kennedy was turning to his left, shaking hands, facing north and so exposing his right side. As recently as 2008, eyewitness John Pilger asserted his belief that there must have been a second gunman. On August 14, 1975, the Los Angeles County Board of Supervisors appointed Thomas F. Kranz as Special Counsel to the Los Angeles County District Attorney's Office to investigate the assassination. The conclusion of the experts was that there was little or no evidence to support this theory.

=== Bullet count ===
Witnesses claimed that bullet holes were found in the door frames of the pantry, which were later destroyed. Kennedy's son Robert F. Kennedy Jr. later said "There were too many bullets" and "You can't fire 13 shots out of an eight-shot gun".

=== Acoustics ===
In 2007, analysis of an audio recording of the shooting made that night by freelance reporter Stanislaw Pruszynski appeared to indicate, according to forensic expert Philip van Praag, that at least 13 shots were fired. Van Praag also said the recording revealed at least two instances in which the time between shots was shorter than humanly possible and that different resonances indicated there was more than one gun. Some other acoustic experts, through their own analyses, have said that no more than eight shots are recorded on the tape. Acoustics expert Edward John Primeau analyzed the recording using the computer program iZotope RX and heard only eight shots.

=== Forensic analysis ===
In 1975, a Los Angeles judge convened a panel of seven experts in forensics to examine ballistic evidence. They found that the three bullets that hit Kennedy were all fired from the same gun, but could not find a match between these bullets and Sirhan's revolver. They accused DeWayne Wolfer, the lead crime scene investigator who had testified at trial that a bullet taken from Kennedy's body was from Sirhan's revolver, of running a careless investigation. The forensic experts urged further investigation. An internal police document, which was later released, concluded that "Kennedy and Weisel bullets not fired from same gun" and "Kennedy bullet not fired from Sirhan's revolver."

On November 26, 2011, Sirhan's defense attorneys William F. Pepper and Laurie Dusek filed a 62-page brief in federal court asserting that a bullet used as evidence to convict Sirhan was switched with another bullet at the crime scene. The brief claims that this was done because the bullet taken from Kennedy's neck did not match Sirhan's gun. Pepper and Dusek claim that the new evidence is sufficient to find Sirhan not guilty under the law.

== The security guard as second gunman theory ==
Thane Eugene Cesar has frequently been cited as the most likely candidate for a second gunman. Cesar had been employed by Ace Guard Service to protect Kennedy at the Ambassador Hotel. This was not his full-time job; during the day he worked as a maintenance plumber at the Lockheed Aircraft plant in Burbank, a job that required security clearance from the Department of Defense. He worked there from 1966 until losing his job in 1971. Author Dan Moldea wrote that in 1973 Cesar began working at Hughes, a job he held for seven years and which Cesar said required the second-highest clearance level at the plant.

Cesar was a staunch opponent of the Kennedys and had publicly said he believed that if elected, Robert Kennedy would have "sold the country down the road to the commies or minorities like his brother did." Cesar also held a number of extremist far-right views.

When interviewed, Cesar stated that he did draw a gun at the scene of the shooting, but insisted the weapon was a Rohm .38, not a .22, the caliber of the bullets found in Kennedy. He also said he got knocked down after the first shot and was unable to fire his gun. The LAPD, which interviewed Cesar shortly after the shooting, did not regard him as a suspect and did not ask to see his gun.

Cesar stated that he did own a .22-caliber Harrington & Richardson pistol, and he showed it to LAPD sergeant P. E. O'Steen on June 24, 1968. But when the LAPD interviewed Cesar three years later, he claimed that he had sold the gun before the assassination to a man named Jim Yoder. William W. Turner tracked down Yoder in October 1972. Yoder still had the receipt for the H&R pistol, dated September 6, 1968, and bearing Cesar's signature, indicating that Cesar had sold the pistol three months after Kennedy's assassination, contradicting his 1971 claim that he had sold the weapon months before it. Moldea wrote that Cesar submitted years later to a polygraph examination by Edward Gelb, former president and executive director of the America Polygraph Association, in which Cesar denied any involvement in the assassination.

Kennedy's son, Robert F. Kennedy Jr., has said Cesar killed his father while Sirhan fired shots but did not hit him. In June 2018, Kennedy said he was going to meet Cesar in the Philippines, but after Cesar demanded a payment of $25,000, he canceled the meeting.

== Manchurian candidate hypothesis ==
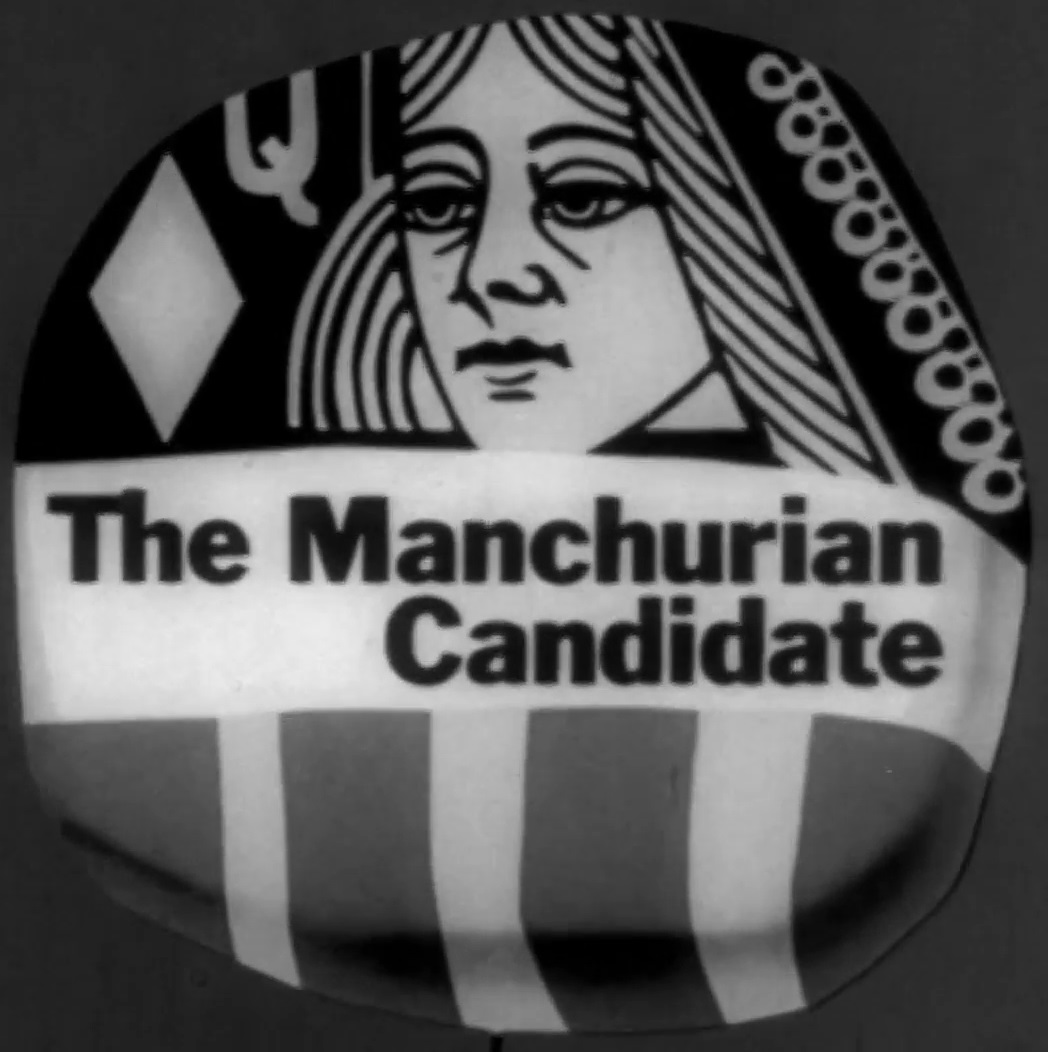
Logo of the 1962 film The Manchurian Candidate, in which the protagonist is brainwashed into becoming an assassin

Another conspiracy theory relates to a Manchurian candidate hypothesis: that someone psychologically programmed Sirhan to commit the murder, that he was not aware of his actions at the time, and that the conspirators "wiped" his mind in the aftermath so that he would have no memory of the event or the people who programmed him. Pepper claimed that this theory was supported by prison psychologist Edward Simson-Kallas. Sirhan claimed then, and has continued to claim, to have no memory of the assassination or its aftermath. In 2010, Sirhan's lawyers accused the CIA of hypnotizing him and making him "an involuntary participant".

== The woman in a polka-dot dress ==
Some witnesses said they saw a woman in a polka-dot dress in various locations throughout the Ambassador Hotel before and after the assassination. One witness, Kennedy campaign worker Sandra Serrano, reported that around 11:30 p.m. she was sitting outside on a stairway that led to the Embassy Ballroom when a woman and two men, one of whom Serrano later said was Sirhan, walked past her up the stairs. Serrano said that around 30 minutes later, she heard noises that sounded like the backfire of an automobile, then saw the woman and one of the men running from the scene. She said that the woman exclaimed, "We shot him, we shot him!" According to Serrano, when she asked the woman to whom she referred, the woman said "Senator Kennedy." Serrano related her account to NBC's Sander Vanocur soon after the shooting.

Another witness, Evan Freed, also saw the woman in the polka-dot dress. Another reported seeing a woman in a polka-dot dress with Sirhan at various times during the evening, including in the kitchen area where the assassination took place. Serrano said that before her encounter with the polka-dot dress woman, she heard a series of shots that sounded like a car backfiring. LAPD criminologist DeWayne Wolfer conducted tests to determine whether Serrano could have heard the shots from her location and found that the shots would have caused just a ½-decibel change in sound at Serrano's location, so she could not have heard the shots. Additionally, Special Counsel Thomas F. Kranz commented in his report that Serrano admitted to fabricating the story after further interviews with investigating officers and that he was unable to find evidence to corroborate any aspect of the original account. Serrano maintained that she was worn down during relentless questioning by LAPD sergeant Hank Hernandez and coerced into a false retraction.

In 1974, retired LAPD officer Paul Sharaga told a newsman with KMPC in Los Angeles that as he was responding to the shooting in the hotel, an elderly couple reported to him that they saw a couple in their early 20s, one of whom was a woman in a polka-dot dress. The couple were smiling and shouting "We shot him... we killed Kennedy... we shot him... we killed him". Sharaga also said that he filed official reports of the incident, but that they disappeared and were never investigated.

== CIA involvement ==
In November 2006, BBC Television's Newsnight aired a 12-minute screening of Shane O'Sullivan's documentary RFK Must Die. O'Sullivan said that while researching a screenplay based on the Manchurian candidate theory, he "uncovered new video and photographic evidence suggesting that three senior CIA operatives were behind the killing of the Senator". He claimed that three men seen in video and photographs at the Ambassador Hotel immediately before and after the assassination were positively identified as CIA operatives David Sánchez Morales, Gordon Campbell and George Joannides.

Several people who had known Morales, including family members, were adamant that he was not the man whom O'Sullivan claimed was Morales. After O'Sullivan published his book, assassination researchers Jefferson Morley and David Talbot discovered that Campbell had died of a heart attack in 1962. In response, O'Sullivan said that the man in the video might have used Campbell's name as an alias. He then took his identifications to the LAPD, whose files showed the men he identified as Campbell and Joannides to be Michael Roman and Frank Owens, two Bulova sales managers attending the company's convention at the Ambassador. O'Sullivan stood by his allegations, stating that the Bulova watch company was a "well-known CIA cover".

== Views of those close to Kennedy ==
Kennedy's second son, Robert F. Kennedy Jr., believes his father was killed by a second gunman and expressed support for Sirhan's possible parole. Kathleen Kennedy Townsend also expressed belief that Sirhan might have not been the killer. Kennedy's other children have not been as vocal or do not wish to reopen an investigation, due to the emotional pain, and they and Kennedy's widow, Ethel, oppose Sirhan's possible release and seem to believe he was the lone killer.

== See also ==
- Conspiracy theories in United States politics
- Copenhagen hypnosis murders
- John F. Kennedy assassination conspiracy theories
- Martin Luther King Jr. assassination conspiracy theories
