= Assassination of Robert F. Kennedy =

1968 shooting in Los Angeles, California

- Robert F. Kennedy lies mortally wounded on the kitchen floor of the Ambassador Hotel immediately after the shooting. Kneeling beside him is 17-year-old busboy Juan Romero, who was shaking Kennedy's hand when Sirhan Sirhan fired the shots.
- Location: 34°03′35″N 118°17′50″W; Ambassador Hotel, Los Angeles, California, U.S.
- Date: June 5, 1968; 58 years ago 12:15 a.m. (UTC−7)
- Target: Robert F. Kennedy
- Attack type: Political assassination
- Weapon: Iver Johnson .22 LR revolver
- Deaths: 1 (Kennedy)
- Injuries: 5 (Note: Paul Schrade, William Weisel, Elizabeth Evans, Ira Goldstein, Irwin Stroll)
- Perpetrator: Sirhan Sirhan
- Verdict: Guilty on all counts
- Convictions: 6 counts (Note: First-degree murder; Assault with a deadly weapon with intent to commit murder (x5))
- Motive: Retribution for Kennedy's support for Israel following the Six-Day War
- Sentence: Death by gas chamber (1969, commuted); Life imprisonment with the possibility of parole (1972)

On June 5, 1968, Robert F. Kennedy was shot by 24-year-old Sirhan Sirhan at the Ambassador Hotel in Los Angeles, California. Medical teams attempted to treat him, but he died the following day at the age of 42.

Kennedy, a United States senator and candidate in the 1968 Democratic Party presidential primaries, won the California and South Dakota primaries on June 4. He addressed his campaign supporters in the Ambassador Hotel's Embassy Ballroom. After leaving the podium, and exiting through a kitchen hallway, he was mortally wounded by multiple shots fired by Sirhan. Kennedy died at Good Samaritan Hospital nearly 25 hours later. His body was returned to the East and buried at Arlington National Cemetery.

Sirhan, a Palestinian Christian who held strong anti-Zionist and pro-Palestinian beliefs, testified at trial in 1969 that he killed Kennedy "with 20 years of malice aforethought"; he was convicted and sentenced to death. Due to People v. Anderson, his sentence was commuted to life in prison in 1972 with a possibility of parole. His parole request has been denied numerous times. Kennedy's assassination prompted the U.S. Secret Service to extend their security to protect presidential candidates. Numerous conspiracy theories arose related to Kennedy's murder.

The assassination was one of several that murdered major political figures in the 1960s in the United States. Others include the assassinations of President John F. Kennedy (elder brother of Robert F. Kennedy) in 1963, Malcolm X in 1965, and Martin Luther King Jr. in April 1968.

== Background ==
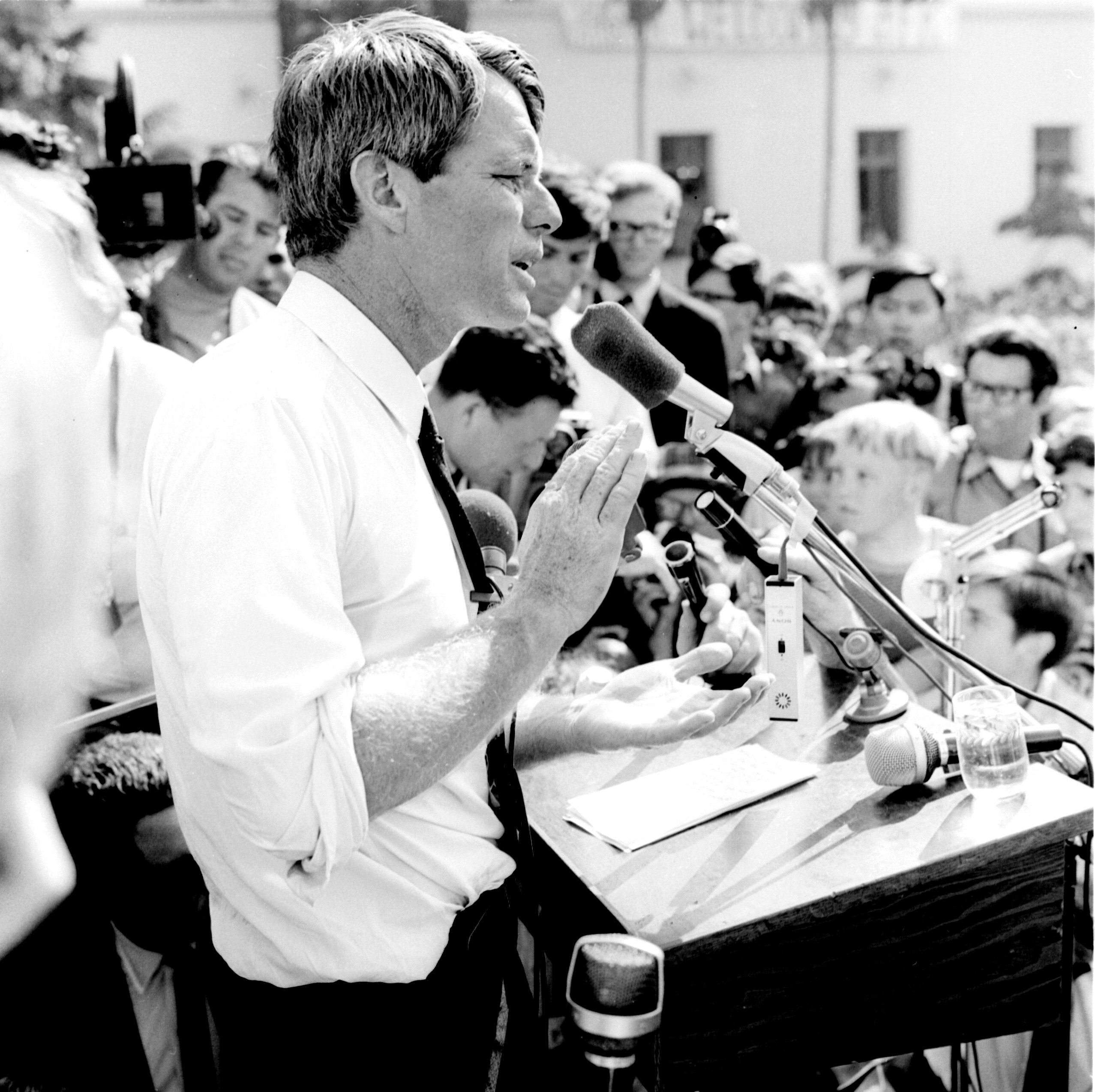
Kennedy campaigning in Los Angeles, 1968

Robert F. Kennedy was born in Brookline, Massachusetts, in 1925. In 1948, he visited Palestine and wrote six dispatches for The Boston Post. He dismissed the possibility of the Jewish state becoming Communist as "fantastically absurd", and called it the "only stabilizing factor remaining in the near and middle East". In 1960, John F. Kennedy, Robert's elder brother, was elected the president of the United States and appointed Robert as U.S. attorney general. During his tenure, Robert served as John's close advisor and was associated with various decisions during the Kennedy administration. According to author Matthew A. Hayes, during the Cuban Missile Crisis, Robert acted as a "de-facto Chief of Staff, Presidential Agent and Intermediary for his brother" and was an "indispensable partner" in its successful resolution. In November 1963, President Kennedy was assassinated, and Robert was deeply affected by it. Vice President Lyndon B. Johnson assumed the presidency and retained almost all prominent Kennedy advisors, including Robert as attorney general.

In 1964, polls showed that various Democrats wanted Kennedy to be Johnson's running mate in that year's presidential election. Kennedy instead organized his senatorial campaign in New York, challenging Kenneth Keating, an incumbent Republican senator. During a campaign speech, Kennedy declared his support for Israel, stating that in the event of an attack, "we will stand by Israel and come to her assistance." He won the election; during his congressional career, he supported civil rights and opposed Johnson's policies regarding the Vietnam War.

The 1968 presidential campaign has been referred to as one of the most volatile campaigns in American history. There was strong opposition to the ongoing Vietnam War; and it was a period of social unrest, with riots in major cities. Allard K. Lowenstein, a Democratic politician, organized a "Dump Johnson" movement to prevent Johnson's nomination as the presidential candidate, and asked Kennedy to run instead. Kennedy refused, asserting that he did not want to split the Democratic Party. Eugene McCarthy, a U.S. senator from Minnesota, then emerged as the leader of the "Dump Johnson" movement and entered several state presidential primaries. In late January 1968, the Tet Offensive in Vietnam, in the view of historian Lloyd Gardner, "shattered hopes that the war could be won within a reasonable period of time—if ever—and broke open the cracks in the Democratic coalition".

On March 12, 1968, in the New Hampshire Democratic primary, McCarthy nearly defeated Johnson with 42 percent to Johnson's 49 percent of the votes. Four days later, Kennedy announced his presidential campaign. On March 31, Johnson announced that he would not seek the presidency. Four days later, civil rights activist Martin Luther King Jr. was assassinated, leading to further riots in several cities. The same day, Kennedy gave a speech in Indianapolis, saying:

What we need in the United States is not division; what we need in the United States is not hatred; what we need in the United States is not violence and lawlessness, but is love, and wisdom, and compassion toward one another, and a feeling of justice toward those who still suffer within our country, whether they be white or whether they be black. ... let us dedicate ourselves to what the Greeks wrote so many years ago: to tame the savageness of man and make gentle the life of this world. Let us dedicate ourselves to that, and say a prayer for our country and for our people.

In April, Vice President Hubert Humphrey announced his candidacy for the presidency. He mostly avoided primaries and focused on states which held caucuses. Contrary to Kennedy, Humphrey did not publicly oppose the Vietnam War.

== Assassination ==
=== California primary and shooting ===
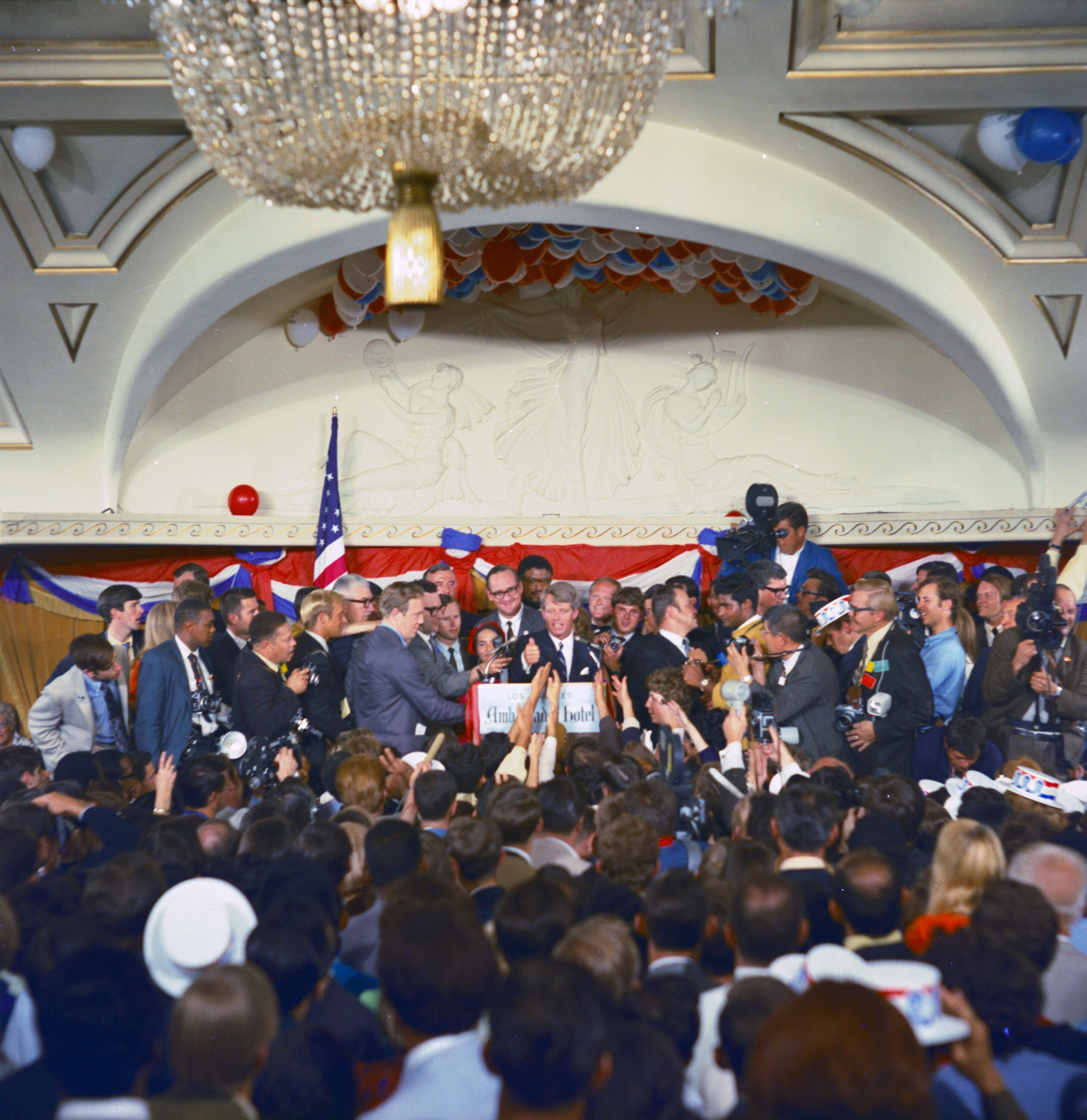
Kennedy addressing supporters in the Embassy Ballroom of the Ambassador Hotel

The California presidential primary elections were held on June 4, 1968. Polls by CBS showed Kennedy leading by 7 percent. The statewide results gave Kennedy 46 percent to McCarthy's 42 percent. Kennedy also won the South Dakota primary, winning approximately 50 percent of the vote. Author Joseph Palermo referred to the victory as Kennedy's "greatest". He was now in second place with 393 1/2 total delegates, against Humphrey's 561 1/2 delegates.

At approximately 12:02 a.m. PDT the next day, Kennedy addressed his campaign supporters in the Embassy Ballroom of the Ambassador Hotel, in the Mid-Wilshire district of Los Angeles. At the time, the government did not provide Secret Service protection for presidential candidates. Kennedy's only security personnel were former Federal Bureau of Investigation agent William Barry and two unofficial bodyguards: Olympic decathlon gold medalist Rafer Johnson and former football player Rosey Grier. At approximately 12:10 am, concluding his victory speech, Kennedy said: "Mayor Yorty has just sent me a message that we've been here too long already. So my thanks to all of you and on to Chicago and let's win there." Kennedy planned to walk through the ballroom after speaking on his way to another gathering of supporters, but reporters wanted a press conference. Campaign aide Fred Dutton decided that Kennedy would forgo the second gathering and instead go through the hotel's kitchen and pantry area behind the ballroom to the press area. Kennedy had welcomed contact with the public during the campaign, and people had often tried to touch him in excitement. Soon after Kennedy concluded the speech, he started to exit through the ballroom when Barry stopped him and said, "No, it's been changed. We're going this way." Barry and Dutton began clearing a way for Kennedy to go left, through swinging doors, to the kitchen corridor, but he was hemmed in by the crowd and followed maître d'hôtel Karl Uecker through a back exit. Uecker led Kennedy through the kitchen area, holding his right wrist, but frequently releasing it as Kennedy shook hands with people whom he encountered. Uecker and Kennedy started down a passageway narrowed by an ice machine and a steam table to the north.

Kennedy turned to his left and shook hands with Juan Romero, just as Sirhan Sirhan stepped down from a low tray-stacker beside the ice machine, rushed past Uecker, and repeatedly fired an eight-shot .22 Long Rifle caliber Iver Johnson Cadet 55-A revolver at point-blank range. Kennedy fell to the floor; others, including writer George Plimpton and Grier, tried to disarm Sirhan, as he continued firing his gun in random directions. Five other people were wounded: William Weisel of ABC News, Paul Schrade of the United Automobile Workers union, Democratic Party activist Elizabeth Evans, Ira Goldstein of the Continental News Service, and Kennedy campaign volunteer Irwin Stroll. A minute later, Sirhan wrestled free and grabbed the revolver again, but others grabbed him. Barry went to Kennedy and placed his jacket under Kennedy's head. As Kennedy lay wounded, Romero cradled his head and placed a rosary in his hand. Kennedy asked Romero, "Is everybody OK?"; Romero responded, "Yes, everybody's OK." Kennedy then turned away and said, "Everything's going to be OK." The moment was captured by Boris Yaro of the Los Angeles Times and became the iconic image of the assassination.

=== Immediate aftermath and death ===
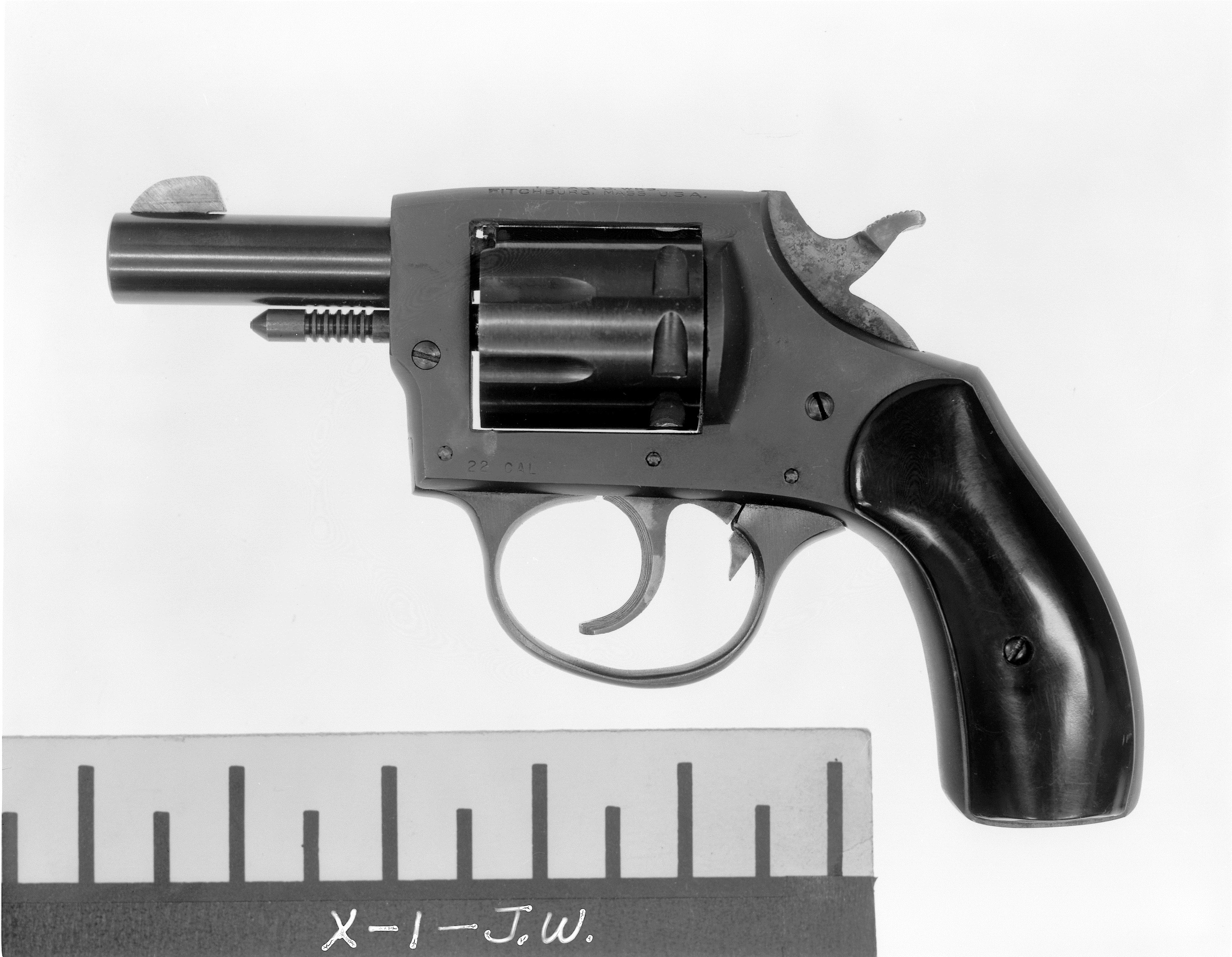
The Iver Johnson .22 caliber revolver that Sirhan used to assassinate Kennedy.

As the shooting took place, ABC News was signing off from its election-night broadcast, while the CBS coverage had been concluded. CBS went back on the air with coverage of the shooting 21 minutes after it had taken place. ABC's associate news director Weisel, who had been wounded during the shooting, reported from his stretcher. ABC was able to show scant live footage from the kitchen after Kennedy had been transported, but all of ABC's coverage from the hotel was in black-and-white. Approximately three hours after the incident, television networks began their morning broadcast schedule. About six million Western American households viewed the live reporting.

Kennedy's wife, Ethel, who was three months pregnant, had been away from the shooting scene. She was soon led to Kennedy and knelt beside him. Kennedy turned his head seeming to recognize her. Kennedy's campaign manager, his brother-in-law Stephen Edward Smith, promptly appeared on television and asked for a doctor. After several minutes, medical attendants arrived and lifted Kennedy onto a stretcher, prompting him to whisper, "Don't lift me", which were his last words; he lost consciousness shortly after. He was taken to Central Receiving Hospital. A doctor slapped his face, calling, "Bob! Bob! Bob!" while another doctor massaged his heart. After obtaining a good heartbeat, doctors handed a stethoscope to Ethel so that she could hear Kennedy's heart beating. After about 30 minutes, Kennedy was transferred several blocks to the Good Samaritan Hospital to undergo surgery. A gymnasium near the hospital was set up as temporary headquarters for the press and news media to receive updates on his condition. Surgery began at 3:12 a.m. and lasted approximately 3 hours and 40 minutes. At 5:30 p.m. on Wednesday, spokesman Frank Mankiewicz announced that Kennedy's doctors were "concerned over his continuing failure to show improvement"; his condition was critical.

Kennedy had been shot multiple times. The fatal shot was fired at a range of 1 inch (3 cm), entering behind his right ear. The other two shots entered at the rear of his right armpit; one exited from his chest and the other lodged in the back of his neck. Despite extensive neurosurgery to remove the bullet and bone fragments from his brain, he was pronounced dead at 1:44 a.m. on June 6, nearly 25 hours after the shooting. Mankiewicz left the hospital and walked to the gymnasium where the press and news media were set up for continuous updates on the situation. At 2 a.m. on June 6, Mankiewicz announced Kennedy's death. The following week, NBC devoted 55 hours to the shooting and its aftermath, ABC 43 hours, and CBS 42 hours, with all three networks initially pre-empting their regular coverage and advertisements to cover the story.

=== Funeral and aftermath ===
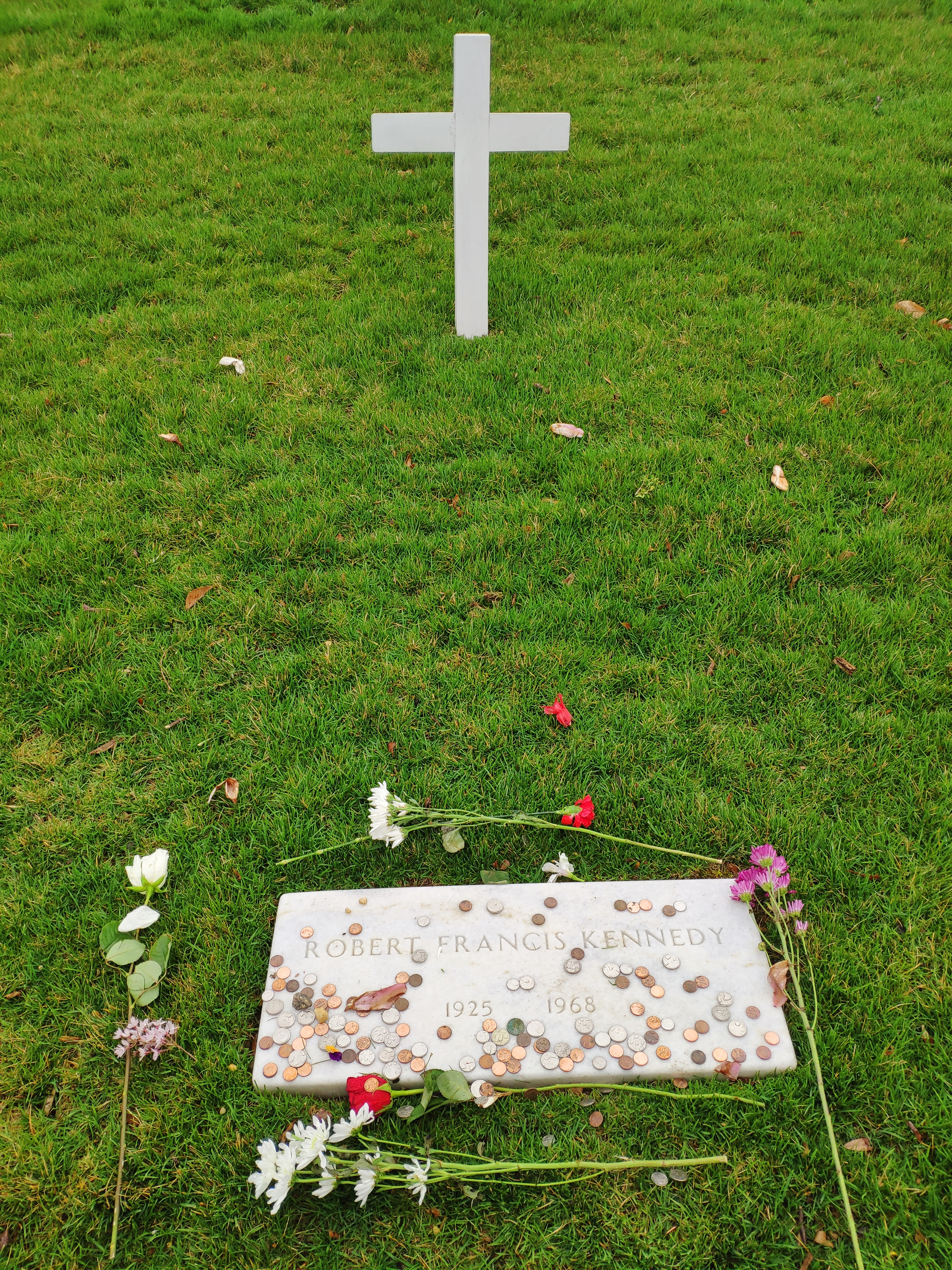
Kennedy's grave in Arlington National Cemetery

Senator Kennedy's casket was taken, via a jet emblazoned with "United States of America" and sent by President Lyndon B. Johnson, to New York City, where his casket was viewed by thousands at St. Patrick's Cathedral. The funeral mass was held on the morning of June 8. Kennedy's younger brother, Senator Ted Kennedy, delivered the eulogy, saying:

My brother need not be idealized, or enlarged in death beyond what he was in life; to be remembered simply as a good and decent man, who saw wrong and tried to right it, saw suffering and tried to heal it, saw war and tried to stop it ... As he said many times, in many parts of this nation, to those he touched and who sought to touch him: "Some men see things as they are and say why. I dream things that never were and say why not."

Kennedy's body was transported via train to Washington, D.C.; many mourners lined the route, paying their respects. On the way to the cemetery, the funeral procession passed through Resurrection City, a shantytown protest site. The procession stopped in front of the Lincoln Memorial, where residents of Resurrection City joined the group, and the "Battle Hymn of the Republic" was sung. Kennedy was buried near his older brother John in Arlington National Cemetery. This was the first burial to have ever taken place there at night. After the assassination, Congress altered the Secret Service's mandate to include protection for major presidential and vice-presidential nominees.

At the time of his death, Kennedy was substantially behind Humphrey in convention delegate support, but many believe that, following his victory in the California primary, he would have ultimately secured the nomination. Humphrey won the nomination at the convention in Chicago, at which violence in the streets occurred. He ultimately lost the general election to Republican nominee Richard Nixon by a narrow popular vote margin of 0.7 percent. Nixon won by a more decisive 301–191 margin in the Electoral College.

== Perpetrator ==
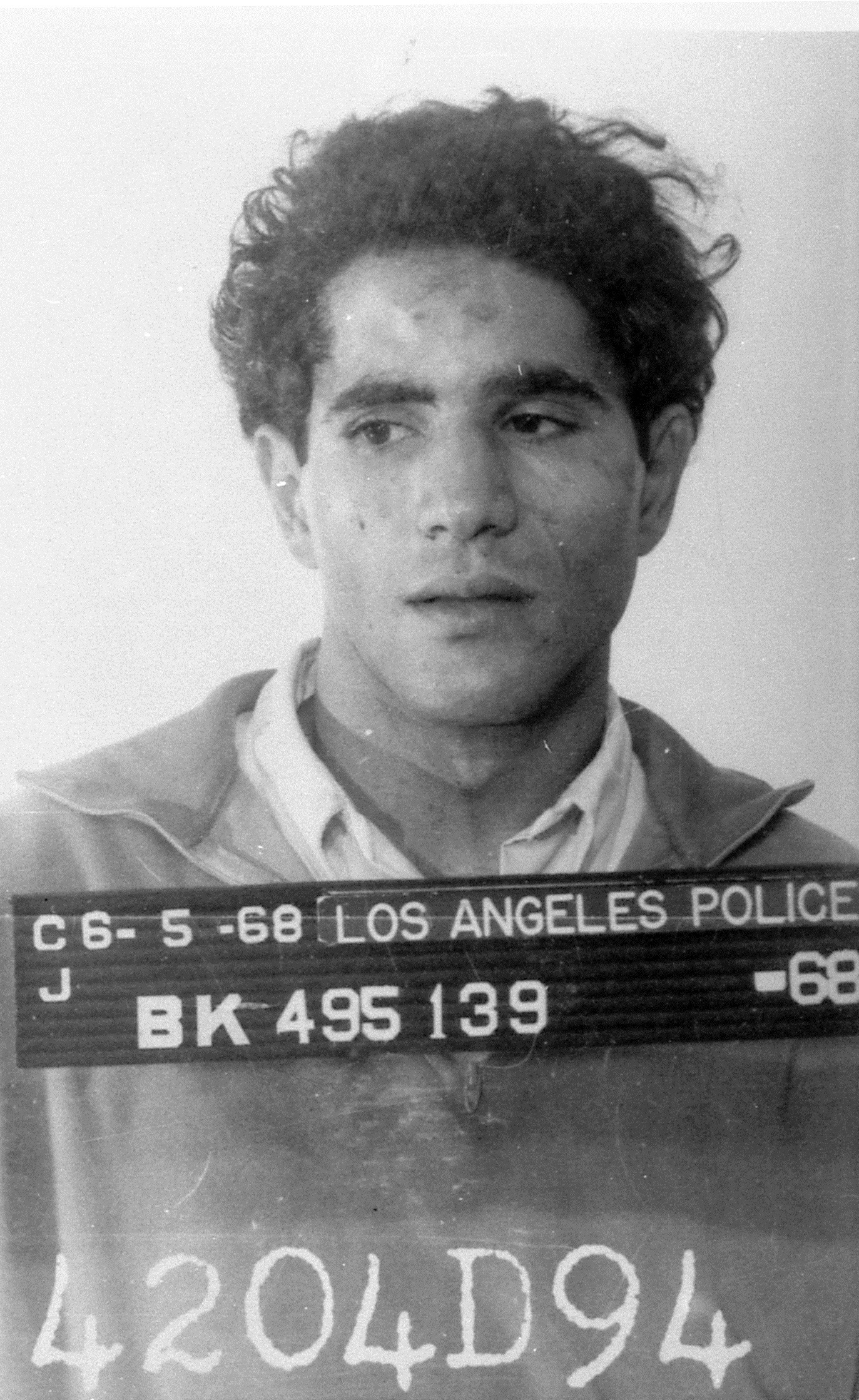
Sirhan's mug shot, taken after his arrest

Sirhan Sirhan was born on March 19, 1944, in Jerusalem, Palestine, to an Arab Christian family. At the age of four, he and his father narrowly escaped a bomb explosion during the 1948 Palestine war. This incident, according to author Mel Ayton, "had a psychological effect on young Sirhan". He witnessed various other violent incidents during his childhood, including physical abuse by his father and the death of his older brother who was hit by a military truck that was trying to avoid sniper fire. In late 1956, Sirhan, along with his family, immigrated to the United States. He was unhappy with immigrating to the United States, later saying that "the U.S. was against the Arabs and was friendly with Israel, and a friend of my enemy is my enemy". Once in the United States, Sirhan received above-average grades and joined an officer candidate school. During his late-teenage years, Sirhan's father abandoned the family, his sister died, two of his brothers were arrested, and he was expelled from Pasadena City College. Sirhan held strongly anti-Zionist and pro-Palestinian beliefs.

In 1966, while pursuing a career as a jockey, Sirhan fell from a running horse, suffering minor injuries. A friend of Sirhan said that after this incident, Sirhan was "impatient, nervous, emotional and always in a hurry". A diary was found during a search of his home, where he wrote on May 18: "Robert Kennedy must be assassinated ... My determination to eliminate RFK is becoming more and more of an unshakable obsession. RFK must die. RFK must be killed."

== Investigation and trial ==
Due to Sirhan being a non-citizen, it was illegal under California law for him to purchase firearms. He violated three California laws by possessing the pistol he used to kill Kennedy. Loren Coleman suggested that the date of the assassination is significant because it was the first anniversary of the start of the Six-Day War between Israel and its Arab neighbors.

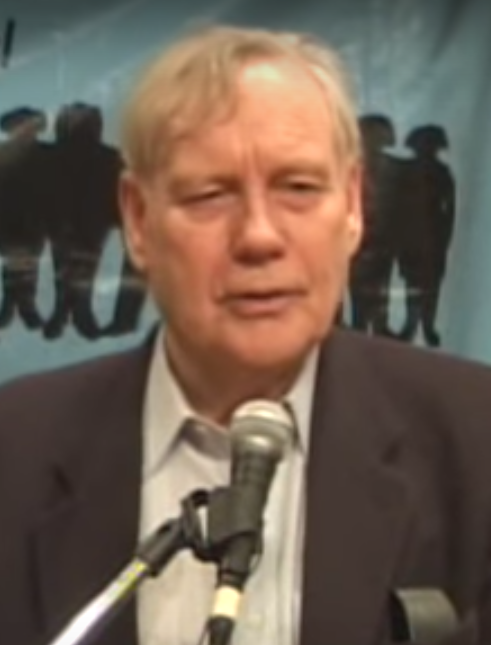
Sirhan's lawyer William F. Pepper

When Sirhan was booked by police, they found in his pocket a newspaper article that discussed Kennedy's support for Israel; Sirhan later said that he began to hate Kennedy after learning of this support. Sirhan was convicted of Kennedy's murder in April 1969, and was sentenced to death. In 1972, the sentence was commuted to life in prison with the possibility of parole, after the California Supreme Court, in its ruling in California v. Anderson, invalidated as unconstitutional all pending death sentences that were imposed before 1972. In 1975, it was decided that Sirhan would be freed on parole in 1984. In 1982, however, the California Board of Prison Term rescinded the parole date, citing death threats made by Sirhan from prison. In 1989, Sirhan told David Frost in prison that his sole connection with Kennedy was "[Kennedy's] support of Israel and his deliberate attempt to send those 50 bombers to Israel to obviously do harm to the Palestinians." Although a study published in the Bulletin of the Atomic Scientists referred to Sirhan as a "withdrawn fanatic with multiple identity problems", the author James W. Clarke stated that Sirhan was more motivated by political issues than by his personal temperament. During the trial, Sirhan's lawyers attempted to use a defense of diminished responsibility, while Sirhan tried to confess to the crime and change his plea to guilty on several occasions. He testified that he had killed Kennedy "with 20 years of malice aforethought". As of 2023, Sirhan has been denied parole 17 times. His lawyers have claimed that he was framed, and he claims to have no memory of his crime.

In February 2012, Sirhan's lawyers William F. Pepper and Laurie Dusek filed a court brief in District Court in Los Angeles, claiming that a second gunman fired the shots that killed Kennedy. It was the fourth in a series of federal briefs filed under habeas corpus by Pepper and Dusek, beginning in October 2010. In 2015, Judge Beverly Reid O'Connell denied the petition. During Sirhan's 2016 parole hearing, Paul Schrade, who was shot and wounded on the assassination night, asserted that the fatal shot to Kennedy was by a different shooter. He claimed that the Los Angeles Police Department (LAPD) destroyed evidence, "hid ballistic evidence exonerating Sirhan, and covered up conclusive evidence that a second gunman fatally wounded Robert Kennedy." In August 2021, the California state parole panel recommended Sirhan's parole. Two of Kennedy's children, Robert Jr. and Douglas, supported the decision, while six others opposed it. Gavin Newsom, the governor of California, denied the parole in January 2022, asserting that "Sirhan has not developed the accountability and insight required to support his safe release into the community."

== Conspiracy theories ==
=== CIA involvement hypothesis ===
In November 2006, the BBC's Newsnight program presented research by filmmaker Shane O'Sullivan alleging that several Central Intelligence Agency (CIA) officers were present on the night of the assassination. The three men who appear in films and photographs from the night of the assassination were identified by former colleagues and associates as former senior CIA officers who had worked together in 1963 at JMWAVE, the CIA's anti-Castro station based in Miami. They were JMWAVE Chief of Operations David Morales, Chief of Maritime Operations Gordon Campbell, and Chief of Psychological Warfare Operations George Joannides. Several people who had known Morales were sure that he was not the man claimed by O'Sullivan. After O'Sullivan published his book, assassination researchers Jefferson Morley and David Talbot discovered that Campbell had died of a heart attack in 1962, six years before Kennedy's assassination. In response, O'Sullivan stated that the man on the video may have used Campbell's name as an alias.

=== Second gunman hypothesis ===
The location of Kennedy's wounds suggested that his assailant had stood behind him, while some witnesses assert that Sirhan faced west as Kennedy moved through the pantry. This has led to the suggestion that a second gunman fired the fatal shot, a possibility supported by Thomas Noguchi, the Chief Medical Examiner and Coroner for the County of Los Angeles, who stated that the fatal shot was behind Kennedy's right ear and had been fired at a distance of approximately 1 inch (2.5 centimeters) to 3 inches (7.6 centimeters). Other witnesses said that Kennedy was turning to his left shaking hands as Sirhan approached, from the east.

In 1975, during a re-examination of the case, experts looked into the possibility of a second gunman, and concluded that there was little or no evidence to support this hypothesis. In 2004, CNN's senior writer Brad Johnson discovered a recording of Kennedy's victory speech, recorded by the Polish journalist Stanisław Pruszyński. Johnson gave the tapes to the audio engineer Philip Van Praag, who analyzed and found 13 shots fired even though Sirhan's gun held only eight rounds. He also stated the recording revealed at least two cases where the timing between shots was shorter than physically possible from Sirhan's gun alone. Forensic audio specialists Wes Dooley and Paul Pegas of Audio Engineering Associates in Pasadena examined the findings and corroborated the presence of at least 10 shots on the tape along with an over-lapping shot. Other acoustic experts have claimed that they could find no more than eight shots recorded on the audiotape. Critics claim that Van Praag misidentified the noise impulses of the recording as gun shots.

In 2008, eyewitness John Pilger asserted his belief that there must have been a second gunman.

== Legacy ==
"It made me realize that no matter how much hope you have it can be taken away in a second."

— Juan Romero

Kennedy's assassination was one of the four major assassinations in the United States in the 1960s, the others being those of John F. Kennedy (1963), Malcolm X (1965), and Martin Luther King Jr. (1968). Some scholars view the assassination as one of the first major incidents of political violence in the United States stemming from the Arab–Israeli conflict in the Middle East.

Until 1987, the LAPD retained the original files, reports, transcripts, fragments of the bullets that struck Kennedy and the four other bystanders in the kitchen pantry, the .22 caliber Iver-Johnson handgun used by Sirhan, Kennedy's blood-stained clothes, and other artifacts related to the assassination. In 1987, the LAPD donated the entire evidence collection (except for Kennedy's clothes) to the California State Archives in Sacramento, for permanent preservation. Kennedy's blood-stained shirt, tie, and jacket are in the possession of the Los Angeles County District Attorney. In 2010, controversy arose when Kennedy's clothing was transported to the California Homicide Investigators Association conference in Las Vegas, where they were included in a temporary public display. Max Kennedy called it a "cheap bid for attention". The items and Kennedy's clothing were removed from the exhibit, with the LAPD apologizing to the Kennedy family.

The Robert F. Kennedy Assassination Archives of the University of Massachusetts Dartmouth contains a large collection of materials on the assassination. In 2006, American filmmaker Emilio Estevez wrote and directed the film Bobby. He attempted to recreate the scene of the assassination through a fictional account. According to the author Ron Briley, "the history in Bobby is often misleading".

In 2023, Robert F. Kennedy Jr.'s wife, Cheryl Hines, called for President Joe Biden to grant her husband Secret Service protection for his presidential campaign, citing his family's history of successful assassinations. Robert F. Kennedy Jr's request for Secret Service protection would not be granted until July 15, 2024; two days after former president and Republican presidential nominee Donald Trump was wounded in an assassination attempt during a speech in Butler, Pennsylvania.

On January 23, 2025, U.S. President Donald Trump signed an executive order to declassify the documents regarding Kennedy's assassination, as well as those regarding the assassinations of John F. Kennedy and Martin Luther King Jr. Among the documents released pertaining to Senator Kennedy's assassination were photographs from his autopsy, depicting his multiple gunshot wounds. Kerry Kennedy, daughter of Senator Kennedy, opposed the release of these files, calling the photographs "graphic, explicit photos of his mangled body" and criticizing the Trump administration for releasing them. Robert F. Kennedy Jr., Health and Human Services secretary in the Trump administration and son of Senator Kennedy, defended the files' release, though he called the decision to let them release the photographs "agonizing."

== See also ==
- Kennedy curse
- List of assassinated American politicians
- List of photographs considered the most important

== Works cited ==
=== Books ===
- Aaronovitch, David (2009). Voodoo Histories: The Role of the Conspiracy Theory in Shaping Modern History. Jonathan Cape. ISBN 978-0-224-07470-4 – via Internet Archive.
- Ayton, Mel (2007). The Forgotten Terrorist: Sirhan Sirhan and the Assassination of Robert F. Kennedy. Potomac Books. ISBN 978-1-59797-079-2 – via Google Books.
- Ayton, Mel (2021). Protecting the Presidential Candidates: From JFK To Biden. Pen and Sword Books. ISBN 978-1-3990-1411-3 – via Google Books.
- Bass, Warren (2003). Support Any Friend. Oxford University Press. ISBN 978-0-19-516580-7 – via Internet Archive.
- Clarke, Thurston (2008). The Last Campaign: Robert F. Kennedy and 82 Days That Inspired America. Henry Holt and Company. ISBN 978-0-8050-7792-6 – via Internet Archive.
- Coleman, Loren (2004). The Copycat Effect: How the Media and Popular Culture Trigger the Mayhem In Tomorrow's Headlines. Paraview Pocket Books. ISBN 978-0-7434-8223-3.
- Davis, John H. (1992). The Kennedys: Dynasty and Disaster. SPI Books. ISBN 978-1-56171-060-7 – via Internet Archive.
- Gabler, Neal (2020). Catching the Wind : Edward Kennedy and the Liberal Hour. Crown Publishing Group. ISBN 978-0-307-40544-9 – via Google Books.
- Guide to U.S. Elections. SAGE Publications. 2010. ISBN 978-1-60426-536-1.
- Heymann, C. David (1998). RFK: A Candid Biography of Robert F. Kennedy. E. P. Dutton. ISBN 978-0-525-94217-7 – via Internet Archive.
- Kaiser, Robert Blair (2008). 'R.F.K. Must Die!': Chasing the Mystery of the Robert Kennedy Assassination (E-Book ed.). The Overlook Press. ISBN 978-1-4683-0868-6 – via Google Books.
- Kotz, Nick (2005). Judgment Days: Lyndon Baines Johnson, Martin Luther King, Jr., and the Laws That Changed America. Houghton Mifflin Harcourt. ISBN 978-0-618-08825-6 – via Internet Archive.
- Melanson, Philip H. (1994). The Robert F. Kennedy Assassination: New Revelations on the Conspiracy and Cover-Up, 1968–1991. Shapolsky Publishers. ISBN 978-1-56171-324-0 – via Google Books.
- Moldea, Dan E. (1995). The Killing of Robert F. Kennedy: An Investigation of Motive, Means, and Opportunity. W. W. Norton & Company. ISBN 978-0-393-03791-3 – via Internet Archive.
- Mossman, Billy C.; Stark, M. W. (1972). The Last Salute: Civil and Military Funerals, 1921–1969. United States Department of the Army. LCCN 77-606843 – via Google Books.
- Newfield, Jack (1988). Robert Kennedy: A Memoir. New American Library. ISBN 978-0-452-26064-1 – via Internet Archive.
- Noguchi, Thomas T. (1983). Coroner. Simon & Schuster. ISBN 978-0-671-46772-2 – via Internet Archive.
- O'Sullivan, Shane (2008). Who Killed Bobby? The Unsolved Murder of Robert F. Kennedy. Union Square Press. ISBN 978-1-4027-5444-9 – via Google Books.
- Palermo, Joseph A. (2001). In His Own Right: The Political Odyssey of Senator Robert F. Kennedy. Columbia University Press. ISBN 978-0-231-12068-5 – via Internet Archive.
- Sanders, Edward (2000). America: 1962–1970. Black Sparrow Press. ISBN 978-1-57423-189-2 – via Google Books.
- Shahidullah, Shahid M. (2008). Crime Policy in America: Laws, Institutions, and Programs. University Press of America. ISBN 978-0-7618-4098-5 – via Google Books.
- Thomas, Evan (2002). Robert Kennedy: His Life. Simon & Schuster. ISBN 978-0-7432-0329-6 – via Internet Archive.
- Witcover, Jules (1988). 85 Days: The Last Campaign of Robert Kennedy. Quill. ISBN 978-0-688-07859-1 – via Internet Archive.
- Vaughn, Robert (2008). A Fortunate Life: Behind-the-Scenes Stories from a Hollywood Legend. Macmillan. ISBN 978-0312590437 – via Internet Archive.

=== Scholarly articles ===
- Briley, Ron (2007). "Bobby (Review)". The Journal of American History. 94 (3). doi:10.2307/25095304. JSTOR 25095304.
- Clarke, James W. (1981). "American Assassins: An Alternative Typology". British Journal of Political Science. 11 (1): 81–104. doi:10.1017/s0007123400002465. ISSN 0007-1234. JSTOR 193462. PMID 11620349. S2CID 41008730.
- Curtin, Mary T. (2000) [1999]. "Humphrey, Hubert Horatio". American National Biography. Oxford University Press. doi:10.1093/anb/9780198606697.article.0700365. ISBN 978-0-19-860669-7. Archived from the original on January 2, 2022.
- Gardner, Lloyd (2000) [1999]. "Johnson, Lyndon Baines". American National Biography. Oxford University Press. doi:10.1093/anb/9780198606697.article.0700147. ISBN 978-0-19-860669-7. Archived from the original on December 20, 2021.
- Goldzwig, Steven R. (2003). "LBJ, the Rhetoric of Transcendence, and the Civil Rights Act of 1968". Rhetoric and Public Affairs. 6 (1). Michigan State University Press: 25–53. doi:10.1353/rap.2003.0029. JSTOR 41939808. S2CID 143697074. Archived from the original on August 14, 2020.
- Hayes, Matthew A. (May 7, 2019). "Robert Kennedy and the Cuban Missile Crisis: A Reassertion of Robert Kennedy's Role as the President's 'Indispensable Partner' in the Successful Resolution of the Crisis" (PDF). History: The Journal of the Historical Association. 104 (361). Wiley: 473–503. doi:10.1111/1468-229x.12815. ISSN 0018-2648. S2CID 164907501. Archived (PDF) from the original on December 27, 2021.
- Hoogenboom, Olive (2000) [1999]. "Lowenstein, Allard Kenneth". American National Biography. Oxford University Press. doi:10.1093/anb/9780198606697.article.0700674. ISBN 978-0-19-860669-7. Archived from the original on December 31, 2021.
- Keene, Ann T. (2013). "McCarthy, Eugene". American National Biography. Oxford University Press. doi:10.1093/anb/9780198606697.article.1501341. ISBN 978-0-19-860669-7. Archived from the original on December 31, 2021.
- Kurtz, Michael L. (1982). "The Assassination of John F. Kennedy: A Historical Perspective". The Historian. 45 (1). Taylor & Francis: 1–19. doi:10.1111/j.1540-6563.1982.tb01568.x. ISSN 0018-2370. JSTOR 24445228. Archived from the original on December 28, 2021 – via Wiley Online Library.
- Meloy, J. Reid (2010) [1992]. "Revisiting the Rorschach of Sirhan Sirhan". Journal of Personality Assessment. 58 (3): 548–570. doi:10.1207/s15327752jpa5803_10. ISSN 0022-3891. PMID 1613657 – via Taylor and Francis.
- O'Neill, William L. (2000) [1999]. "Kennedy, Robert Francis". American National Biography. Oxford University Press. doi:10.1093/anb/9780198606697.article.0700153. ISBN 978-0-19-860669-7. Archived from the original on November 4, 2021.
- Sieg, Kent G. (1996). "The 1968 Presidential Election and Peace in Vietnam". Presidential Studies Quarterly. 26 (4). Wiley: 1062–1080. ISSN 0360-4918. JSTOR 27551671. Archived from the original on December 31, 2021.
- Socarides, Charles W. (1979). "Why Sirhan Killed Kennedy: Psychoanalytic Speculations on an Assassination". Journal of Psychohistory. 6 (4): 447–460. ISSN 0145-3378. PMID 11610505.

=== Magazines ===
- Hodak, George (2012). "Precedents: April 17, 1969, Sirhan Sirhan Convicted". ABA Journal. Vol. 98, no. 4. American Bar Association. ISSN 0747-0088. JSTOR 23207729.
- "Once Again ..." (PDF). Newsweek. June 17, 1968. ISSN 0028-9604. Archived (PDF) from the original on March 4, 2021 – via Harold Weisberg Archive.
- "A Life on the Way to Death". Time. June 14, 1968. ISSN 0040-781X. Archived from the original on February 17, 2022.
- "Everything Was Not Enough". Time. June 14, 1968. ISSN 0040-781X. Archived from the original on September 10, 2021.
- "What Was Going On?". Time. June 14, 1968. ISSN 0040-781X. Archived from the original on September 10, 2021.
- "The Man Who Loved Kennedy". Time. February 21, 1969. ISSN 0040-781X. Archived from the original on September 10, 2021.
- "Trials: Behind Steel Doors". Time. January 17, 1969. ISSN 0040-781X.
- "Trials: A Deadly Iteration". Time. March 7, 1969. ISSN 0040-781X.
- Lopez, Steve (June 8, 1998). "Guarding The Dream – Thirty Years Later, Juan Romero Honors R.F.K." Time. ISSN 0040-781X. Archived from the original on September 10, 2021.
- "The JFK and RFK Assassinations and the "Manchurian Candidate" Theory". Crime Magazine. October 1, 2008. Archived from the original on January 3, 2010.

=== News sources ===
- "Video: June 5, 1968: Robert F. Kennedy is Assassinated". ABC News. Archived from the original on September 4, 2021.
- Allen, Nick (August 30, 2015). "Busboy Describes Bobby Kennedy's Final Moments". The Daily Telegraph. ISSN 0307-1235.
- "CIA Role Claim in Kennedy Killing". BBC News. November 21, 2006.
- Blankstein, Andrew (March 3, 2010). "LAPD Apologizes to Robert Kennedy's Family". Los Angeles Times. ISSN 0458-3035.
- Murphy, Jarrett (March 7, 2003). "Sirhan Sirhan Kept Behind Bars". CBS News.
- Martinez, Michael; Johnson, Brad (March 13, 2012). "Attorneys for RFK convicted killer Sirhan push 'second gunman' argument". CNN.
- "Bullet Switch Proves Sirhan Sirhan Innocent of Robert F Kennedy Assassination, Claim Lawyers". Daily Record. November 30, 2011. ISSN 0956-8069.
- Dershowitz, Alan M. (February 20, 1972). "The Nation". The New York Times. ISSN 0362-4331.
- Esty-Kendall, Jud (June 1, 2018). "The Busboy Who Cradled A Dying RFK Recalls Those Final Moments". NPR.
- Hayes, Ashley (March 4, 2010). "After Criticism, LAPD Pulls RFK Clothing from Homicide Exhibit". CNN.
- Holley, Peter (February 10, 2016). "This Kennedy Confidant has Spent Decades Calling for the Release of RFK's Killer". The Washington Post. Archived from the original on February 11, 2016.
- Issenberg, Sasha (June 8, 2008). "RFK's Death Now Viewed as First Case of Mideast Violence Exported to U.S." The San Diego Union-Tribune. ISSN 1063-102X. Archived from the original on June 11, 2008.
- Jackman, Tom (June 6, 2018). "The Bobby Kennedy assassination tape: Were 13 shots fired or only 8?". The Washington Post.
- "A Moment of Victory, Then the Dream Died". Los Angeles Times. March 5, 1986. Archived from the original on October 8, 2019.
- "Irwin N. Stroll; Wounded in RFK Slaying, He Became Famed Designer". Los Angeles Times. February 20, 1995.
- Lovett, Ian (March 2, 2011). "California: Sirhan Sirhan Denied Parole". The New York Times. Archived from the original on March 25, 2022.
- Newsom, Gavin (January 13, 2022). "Newsom: Why I will not release Sirhan Sirhan on parole". Los Angeles Times.
- Turner, Wallace (May 22, 1982). "Panel in California Cancels Sirhan's 1984 Parole Date". The New York Times.
- Reynolds, Christopher (January 5, 2007). "Double Exposure of History and Art, in a Shutter's Click". Los Angeles Times. ISSN 0458-3035. Archived from the original on February 18, 2022.
- Romine, Taylor; Almasy, Steve (March 1, 2023). "Sirhan Sirhan, RFK's assassin, denied parole by board whose members had recommended it in 2021". CNN.
- Segalov, Michael (October 6, 2018). "Rory Kennedy: 'In our family there was no tolerance for being a victim'". The Guardian. ISSN 0261-3077.
- Stempel, Jonathan (January 6, 2015). "Sirhan Sirhan Loses Bid for Freedom Over RFK Death". Reuters.
- "Did the CIA kill Bobby Kennedy?". The Guardian. November 20, 2006. ISSN 0261-3077.
- Randerson, James (January 27, 2007). "Would Robert Kennedy Have Been President?". The Guardian. ISSN 0261-3077.
- "New Evidence Challenges Official Picture of Kennedy Shooting". The Guardian. February 22, 2008. ISSN 0261-3077.
- "Sirhan Sirhan: Six Kennedy Children Condemn Secision to Grant Killer Parole". The Guardian. August 28, 2021. ISSN 0261-3077.
- "Assassination: The Night Bobby Kennedy Was Shot". The Independent. January 21, 2007. ISSN 1741-9743.
- "Transcript of Kennedy Primary Victory Speech" (PDF). The New York Times. June 6, 1968. ISSN 0362-4331. Archived (PDF) from the original on January 9, 2022 – via Harold Weisberg Archive.
- "Sirhan Felt Betrayed by Kennedy". The New York Times. February 20, 1989. ISSN 0362-4331.
- Willon, Phil (January 13, 2022). "Gov. Gavin Newsom Rejects Parole for Sirhan Sirhan, Convicted of Killing Robert F. Kennedy". Los Angeles Times.
- Teeter, Lawrence (February 5, 2005). "Hypnosis in the Case of Sirhan Sirhan". L.A. Times. Archived from the original on November 16, 2022.

=== Web sources ===
- "Robert F. Kennedy Memorial". Arlington National Cemetery. Archived from the original on May 11, 2008.
- "RFK Assassination Archives". Claire T. Carney Library.
- "Democracy Now! Special: Robert F. Kennedy's Life and Legacy 40 Years After His Assassination". Democracy Now!. June 5, 2008.
- "Robert F. Kennedy Assassination (b)". Federal Bureau of Investigation. April 5, 1977. Archived from the original on February 27, 2022.
- "Secret Service History". United States Secret Service. Archived from the original on May 13, 2008.
- Shapell, Benjamin; Willen, Sara (June 5, 2018). "The Assassination & Funeral of Robert F. Kennedy". Shapell Manuscript Foundation.
- Wells, Leslie (2018). "RFK's Assassination: 'We Lost a Chance'" (PDF). Indiana University–Purdue University Indianapolis.
- "Robert F. Kennedy Assassination Investigation Records". Secretary of State of California.
- "List of Physical Evidence" (PDF). Secretary of State of California.
- "Indeterminate Sentence Parole Release Review: Sirhan Sirhan, B-21014" (PDF). State of California. January 13, 2022.
- "The Real Story of the Assassination of Robert F. Kennedy" by Donald E. Wilkes, Jr. Flagpole.com, June 9, 2019.
- "Thane Eugene Cesar: RFK Jr. Calls Him Possible Assassin" by Jessica McBride, Heavy.com, Sept. 13, 2019.
- "Dan Moldea on the polygraph test he arranged for Thane Eugene Cesar" from Moldea's book, The Killing of Robert F. Kennedy: An Investigation of Motive Means, and Opportunity.
