= Directorio Revolucionario Estudiantil =

1960s Cuban student activist group linked to CIA

Student Revolutionary Directorate
- Directorio Revolucionario Estudiantil
- Founded: 1960
- Dissolved: 1966
- Country: Cuba
- Allegiance: CIA

The Directorio Revolucionario Estudiantil (abbreviation: DRE; English: Student Revolutionary Directorate) was a Cuban student activist group launched in opposition to Fidel Castro in 1960, based at the United States, where it soon developed links with the Central Intelligence Agency. In August 1962 it carried out an attack on a beachfront Havana hotel. As of 1963, it was the largest anti-Castro student group in Miami; it also had a chapter in New Orleans, where it had contact with Lee Harvey Oswald in mid-1963. Immediately after the November 22, 1963, assassination of John F. Kennedy, it launched a campaign asserting that Lee Harvey Oswald had been acting on behalf of the Cuban government. The group lost its CIA support in December 1966.

== History ==
The Directorio Revolucionario Estudiantil (DRE) was formed in February 1960 by a group of University of Havana students who publicly opposed the visit of Soviet diplomat Anastas Mikoyan, leading to their expulsion from the university. Later that year, the group moved its headquarters to Miami. There, the group developed connections with the Central Intelligence Agency. (Note: E. Howard Hunt and David Atlee Phillips both spoke highly of the group's leaders in their memoirs.) On August 24 1962, the DRE carried out an attack in Cuba, with two speedboats firing approximately sixty 20-millimeter shells into the Havana suburb of Miramar, damaging a beachfront hotel, (Note: DRE members involved included Isidro Bovje, Leslie Nohregas, Juan Manuel Salvat and José Basulto.) the Rosita Hornedo, which housed advisers sent to Cuba from the Soviet bloc. The attack had been planned by the CIA's JMWAVE station in Miami, though the U.S. State Department maintained the attempt was independent of U.S. government knowledge or support.

In mid-1962, the DRE passed on early reports of Soviet missiles in Cuba to its CIA connections; the presence of missiles was confirmed by Lockheed U-2 photographs in October 1962, prompting the ensuing Cuban Missile Crisis. The group expressed disappointment that the missile crisis was resolved without the forceful ousting of Fidel Castro.

In mid-1963, the CIA financed the DRE with $25,000 per month under a CIA program named AMSPEL. This was run by the career CIA officer George Joannides, the chief of the psychological warfare branch JMWAVE station in Miami. The money went to Luis Fernandez Rocha, the DRE's leader in Miami, and supported the DRE's activities in cities including New Orleans. Joannides also provided non-financial support by reviewing military plans and briefing the DRE leadership on press relations. Joannides worked with the group from December 1962 to April 1964; CIA monthly reports on the group from 1960 to 1966 have been declassified, except for this period.

In August 1963, the DRE had several significant contacts with Lee Harvey Oswald in New Orleans. Oswald had approached a member, Carlos Bringuier, and pretended to be sympathetic to the DRE's goals. When DRE members later saw him handing out pro-Castro leaflets on a street corner, their confrontation became physical and resulted in Oswald's arrest. The Warren Commission interpreted these contacts as a successful attempt by Oswald to attract attention as a left-wing activist; Gerald Posner, however, believes the DRE's harassment of Oswald helped provoke the assassination. Later the same month, Oswald took part in a local radio debate with DRE members.

The day after the assassination of John F. Kennedy, the DRE—defying orders from Joannides to await instructions—launched a public campaign asserting that Lee Harvey Oswald had acted on behalf of the Cuban government. Members communicated their claims to Paul Bethel, a former CIA employee active in Cuban exile politics, and to Clare Boothe Luce. On 23 November 1963, they published a seven-page brief on Oswald, as well as a special edition of the DRE's monthly bulletin, a four-page broadsheet which ran the headline "The Presumed Assassins" above photographs of Oswald and Fidel Castro. The group held a press conference in which they asserted their case using accurate information about Oswald, as well as the undocumented claim that he had lived in the Moscow home of the Soviet foreign minister for two months. DRE members later said that the aim was to create public pressure for a US attack on Cuba.

The CIA began to cut back its support for the DRE at the end of 1962, and ended its support entirely in December 1966 when it characterized the group as inactive. In the intervening years, the DRE members had supported the CIA with its publishing and radio programs, and by sending delegates to international student conferences.

== See also ==
- Cuban Dissident Movement
- Cuban Post-Revolution Exodus
- Golden Exile
- Bay of Pigs Invasion
- Cuban Revolutionary Council
