= George Joannides =

CIA agent (1922–1990)

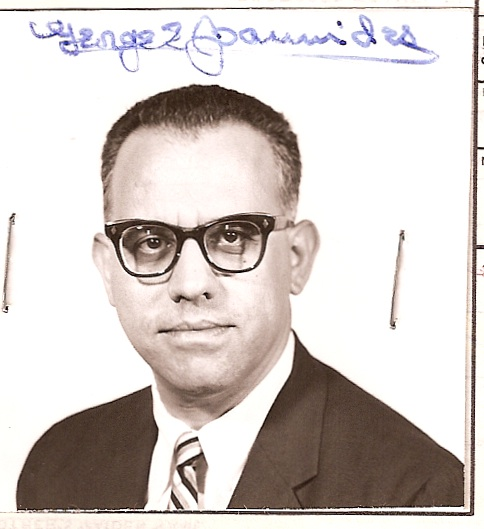
- Joannides in 1963
- Born: George Efthyron Joannides; July 5, 1922; Athens, Greece
- Died: March 9, 1990 (aged 67); Houston, Texas, U.S.
- Education: City College of New York; St. John's University School of Law, LL.B.
- Occupations: Intelligence officer, Lawyer

George Efthyron Joannides (July 5, 1922 – March 9, 1990) was a Central Intelligence Agency officer. In 1963, he was the chief of the Psychological Warfare branch of the agency's JMWAVE station in Miami. In 1978, he was the agency's liaison to the United States House Select Committee on Assassinations.

== Early life and education ==
Joannides was born on July 5 1922, in Athens, Greece. His family immigrated to New York in 1923. He attended the City College of New York and St. John's University School of Law. Besides speaking English, he was fluent in Greek and French, and competent in Spanish.

== Career ==
Before 1949, he worked for the Greek diasporic newspaper National Herald. From 1949 to 1950, he worked in the press office of the Greek Embassy in Washington, D.C. In 1950, he joined the Central Intelligence Agency.

Joannides entered on duty as a GS-07 Contract Employee on September 25, 1950 and in January 1951 was sent to Athens as a case officer working for SR (Soviet Russia) Division. By 1955 he had risen to the GS-12 level. In addition to Soviet operations, he engaged in other operations in the communist party, covert action, and local penetration fields. He was converted to Staff Employee in August 1958. Joannides remained in Athens another four years and became a recognized expert on Greek political affairs. In 1959, he was made Deputy Chief of the Political Section of the Internal Operations Branch. He was promoted to GS-13 the following year.

In 1962, Joannides returned to the U.S. for his first non-Greek assignment, serving as Deputy Chief of the Psychological Warfare Branch for the CIA's anti-Castro task force in Miami. Promoted to GS-14 that December, he rose to Chief of the branch at the JMWAVE station by 1963, operating under Deputy Director of Plans Richard "Dick" Helms. with a staff of 24 and a budget of $1.5 million (equivalent to $16 million in 2025). Joannides was charged with managing anti-Castro propaganda and the disruption of pro-Castro organizations. In that role, he was also known by the cover names "Howard", "Mr. Howard", and "Walter Newby".

Joannides directed and financed the Directorio Revolucionario Estudantil (DRE), or Student Revolutionary Directorate, a group of anti-Castro Cuban exiles whose officers had contact with Lee Harvey Oswald in New Orleans in the months before the assassination of President John F. Kennedy on November 22, 1963. Oswald took part in a local radio debate with DRE members, a tape of which was made and sent to Joannides. By some accounts, fashioned with the "plausible deniability" typical of CIA operations, the plan was designed to link Oswald to Castro's government, without disclosing the CIA's role.

Joannides returned to Athens in July 1964 as head of a ten-person branch engaged in Soviet and Cuban operations. In 1965, he was shifted to head the Branch conducting internal Greek operations. He was promoted to GS-15 in September 1968. He remained in Athens until September 1969, when he was reassigned to Headquarters as Chief of the Greece Cyprus Desk. This assignment lasted only six months, however, because he was hand-picked by the new Chief of Vietnam Station to head the Station's Political Operations Division. When Vietnam Station was reorganized in March 1972, Joannides became Deputy Chief of the newly created Saigon Base until April 1973. Joannides' next assignment was as Chief of the Covert Action Staff of Western Hemisphere Division. In July 1974, he was transferred to the equivalent position in the East Asia Division. Joannides entered the "supergrade" ranks in April 1975 with his promotion to GS-16.

On January 19, 1976, Joannides was selected to head CIA's East Asia Division's Operations Evaluation and Management staff. He continued this assignment until June 1978, when he was selected to assist the Agency's senior coordinator for work with the House Select Committee on Assassinations (HSCA), an assignment he continued until his retirement in January 1979. Reporter Jefferson Morley wrote: "The spy [Joannides] withheld information about his own actions in 1963 from the congressional investigators he was supposed to be assisting. It wasn't until 2001, 38 years after Kennedy's death, that Joannides' support for the Cuban exiles, who clashed with Oswald and monitored him, came to light." G. Robert Blakey, the Chief Counsel and Staff Director of the HSCA, later said that Joannides "obstructed our investigation" and that if he had known about Joannides' Cuban operations he would have "demanded that the agency take him off the job" and "sat him down and interviewed him. Under oath." According to Dan Hardway, an investigator for the HCSA, Joannides was running a "covert operation" to obstruct their investigation into the assassination. Hardway says that once tasked to HCSA, Joannides limited their access to files and changed the process for file requests. Another HSCA investigator, Gaeton Fonzi, said of Joannides that "instead of facilitating document requests he was more and more dancing around, delaying and blocking them". The CIA later evaluated Joannides' performance in this role as "outstanding".

Joannides retired from the CIA on January 12, 1979. In July 1981, he was awarded the Career Intelligence Medal, where his liaison role with the HCSA and his work with the Cuban exiles were cited among a multitude of reasons for the award. Specifically, Joannides was recommended for the Career Intelligence Medal "for his more than twenty-eight years of devoted and effective service to the Agency" during which he received high commendations for his performance throughout each stage of his career, beginning as an area expert on Greek affairs, where he developed his expertise in the discipline of covert action, and culminating in his assignment in the management of CIA's largest division. "The diversity of his assignments, and the way he rose to the challenge of each," cumulatively contributed greatly to the mission of the Agency, and justified the issuance of the Career Intelligence Medal.

In 1976, Joannides also started an immigration law practice in Washington, DC.

In 2013, John R. Tunheim and Thomas E. Samoluk wrote in the Boston Herald:

There is a body of documents that the CIA is still protecting, which should be released. Relying on inaccurate representations made by the CIA in the mid-1990s, the Review Board decided that records related to a deceased CIA agent named George Joannides were not relevant to the Kennedy assassination. Subsequent work by researchers, using other records that were released by the board, demonstrates that these records should be made public.

In 2022, the Mary Ferrell Foundation filed a lawsuit in an attempt to secure the release of the Joannides files. In 2025, government documents revealed that Joannides had contact with the anti-Castro Cuban exile Directorio Revolucionario Estudiantil (DRE), which confronted Oswald three months before the assassination of John F. Kennedy. The DRE themselves had claimed their CIA contact went by the name "Howard" and these documents revealed that Joannides did in fact go by the cover name "Howard". Previously the CIA had denied to the Warren Commission and the House Select Committee on Assassinations (HSCA) that such an individual existed, and in 1998 they told the Assassinations Records Review Board that "Howard" may have been "nothing more than a routing indicator". When the HSCA asked Joannides about the identity of the DRE's CIA contact, Joannides answered that he did not know and would try to find out. The HSCA mandate expired before it could press the matter further and thus did not discover that the contact was in fact Joannides himself.

== Personal life and death ==
Joannides and his wife Violet had three children, and lived in Pinecrest, Florida. In his later years, he had heart problems and moved to Houston, Texas to receive medical treatment from Michael DeBakey. He died on March 9, 1990, aged 67.
