= Harold Weisberg =

American writer and assassination researcher (1913–2002)

- Born: Harold Weisberg; April 8, 1913 Philadelphia, Penn., U.S.
- Died: February 21, 2002 (aged 88) Frederick, Maryland
- Occupation: Journalist, government analyst, poultry farmer, author
- Notable works: Whitewash
- Spouse: Lillian Stone (m. 1939)

Harold Weisberg (April 8, 1913 – February 21, 2002) was a former newspaper reporter and U.S. Senate staff investigator who spent the last decades of his life researching and writing about the JFK assassination. Sometimes dubbed "the dean of the assassination researchers", Weisberg was one of the foremost members of the so-called first-generation critics of the Warren Commission. His best-known work was the four-part series, Whitewash. He also wrote about the assassination of Martin Luther King Jr.

== Biography ==
=== Early life ===
Harold Weisberg, the son of Russian Jewish immigrants, was born in Philadelphia in 1913. When he was in the fifth grade, his family moved to Wilmington, Delaware, where he spent the remainder of his childhood. He showed an early interest in writing and journalism, and became editor of his high school newspaper. While attending the University of Delaware, he had news articles published in the Wilmington Morning News and the Sunday supplement of the Philadelphia Ledger. He left college before graduating when his father died unexpectedly in 1934. Weisberg relocated to Washington, D.C., in order to obtain a better-paying job than he was earning as a reporter.

=== Government service ===
After working in the Agriculture Department, he landed a position in 1936 with the new Senate Civil Liberties Committee under Chairman Robert M. La Follette Jr. Created as a result of the Wagner Act, the committee's tasks included probing anti-union activities by corporations. Weisberg assisted Justice Department lawyers in preparing subpoenas for witnesses, and he investigated labor-rights violations in Harlan County, Kentucky. He enjoyed working for the La Follette committee but was fired in October 1939 for allegedly leaking confidential information to the press (he disputed the allegation). For the next three years he was a freelance journalist, mostly writing articles for Click magazine on subjects such as Nazi cartels and illegal German-American business arrangements. In late 1942 he joined the U.S. Army. He was assigned to the Office of Strategic Services (OSS), where he was an analyst and troubleshooter.

After the war, Weisberg and other former OSS members were moved to the State Department. In June 1947, he became a casualty of the Second Red Scare when he was one of ten State Department employees fired following pressure from the House Un-American Activities Committee. Although there were no hearings held or charges filed, the presumed explanation is that the employees were dismissed for being potential security risks. Weisberg later said he suspected that anti-Semitism was a factor since nine of the ten fired employees were Jewish.

Not long after this episode, Weisberg sought to distance himself from Washington, D.C., and government work by starting a new career as a poultry farmer. He and his wife Lillian bought a tract of land on the northwestern end of Montgomery County, Maryland. Their business thrived in the 1950s, but then adversity struck when a nearby military base began flying helicopters directly over their farm. Weisberg filed lawsuits to gain relief from the noise, claiming the low-flying helicopters caused his chickens to panic and ruined his flock, but to no avail. He was in the process of dissolving the poultry business when he heard the news from Dallas that President Kennedy had been killed.

=== JFK assassination ===
When the Warren Report was published in September 1964, Weisberg purchased and studied it, and he did the same with the 26-volume Warren Commission Hearings & Exhibits released two months later. Incensed by what he regarded as a shoddy, deceptive government investigation, he self-published in August 1965 an angry response, Whitewash, about which he wrote:

Following thousands of hours of research in and analysis of the vast, chaotic, deliberately disorganized, padded and largely meaningless 26 volumes of the testimony and exhibits of the President's Commission on the Assassination of President John F. Kennedy and its 900-page Report – millions of words of which are not needed and are merely diversionary – I published the results of my investigation in a book, Whitewash: The Report on the Warren Report.... I establish that the inquiry into the assassination was a whitewash, using as proof only what the Commission avoided, ignored, misrepresented and suppressed of its own evidence.

Whitewash argues that "careful analysis of the evidence presented in the Warren Commission's report undermined the single-bullet theory and, with it, the possibility that Lee Harvey Oswald had acted alone." Dell Publishing put out a reprint edition of the book in 1966.

In a New Republic review of Whitewash and of Edward Jay Epstein's Inquest, Alex Campbell lauded both authors for poring over the published assassination materials and spotting discrepancies and unanswered questions. Campbell noted how Weisberg had identified numerous instances of conflicting eyewitness testimony about the bullet wounds in JFK, and in murdered Dallas policeman J. D. Tippit, and yet the Warren Report "showed absolutely no curiosity about those glaring contradictions".

Writing in the Stanford Law Review, John Kaplan was much more critical of Whitewash, calling it "the most strident, bitter, and generally irrational of all the attacks on the Commission." Time magazine likened Whitewash to Mark Lane's bestselling Rush to Judgment, stating that both books "offer no connected account of what they think occurred, Mr. Weisberg contenting himself with a ceaseless small-fire of rhetorical questions, Mr. Lane with a steady barrage of innuendo."

Whitewash was followed by Whitewash II, self-published in late 1966. The latter book gives a harsh assessment of the JFK autopsy, citing how basic autopsy documents were never made public and were missing from the Warren Commission's files. Weisberg says the president "got an autopsy unworthy of a Bowery Bum." Whitewash II also closely examines the Zapruder film and uses it to question the assassination's time sequence specified in the Warren Report (WR). He went on to publish two more volumes in the Whitewash series.

In the late 1960s, Weisberg worked with New Orleans District Attorney Jim Garrison in his prosecution of Clay Shaw for conspiring to assassinate JFK. Weisberg helped Garrison by testifying in April 1967 as an assassination expert in the grand jury proceedings before the Shaw trial. Garrison contributed the foreword to Weisberg's Oswald in New Orleans (1967), and later praised the Maryland researcher in his own book, On the Trail of the Assassins (1988).

=== King assassination ===
Weisberg also devoted time to studying the assassination of Martin Luther King Jr. After being hired as an investigator by convicted assassin James Earl Ray, Weisberg came to believe his client had not fired the bullet that killed King. In his book Frame-Up (1971), Weisberg characterizes Ray as filling the same role as Oswald: "the decoy, the patsy, the man meant to be caught." Weisberg contends that Ray was pressured into pleading guilty (which he subsequently recanted) to avoid the disclosures of a full trial.

Weisberg found similar motifs in the King and JFK assassinations. For example, that Ray, like Oswald, seemed to have a "double": somebody else knew about and was using Ray's aliases; a duplicate driver's license for Ray was picked up by somebody other than him in Birmingham, Alabama; two white Mustangs (one containing Ray) fled the scene after the King shooting in Memphis — and that a double points to a conspiracy.

In his review of Frame-Up, Fred J. Cook said of Weisberg:

He is an indefatigable researcher. Unfortunately, he is not a skilled writer. His book suffers from lack of organization and conciseness. He mentions an issue in passing, then pages or even chapters later he goes back and worries it. He repeatedly lashes out at virtually all concerned in the minitrial as liars and scoundrels, devoting long passages to denunciation instead of the cool presentation of evidence. Though his indignation is in most instances thoroughly justified, it gets in the way of the story. But when all this has been said, Weisberg remains invaluable. He has pursued the facts, and they are there, buried in the mass of his book.

Weisberg was a frequent user of the Freedom of Information Act (FOIA) to petition the U.S. government for assassination records. He filed multiple FOIA lawsuits to obtain copies of photographs and documents related to the King assassination.

=== Clashes with other critics ===
Despite his role as a leader within the community of Warren Commission critics, Weisberg had feuds with several of his colleagues. Among his unpublished manuscripts is A Citizen's Descent, a diatribe against Mark Lane for his perceived egotism which Weisberg disapproved of.

When Richard Popkin's book The Second Oswald was published in 1966, Weisberg accused Popkin of plagiarism, because Whitewash already had a chapter about a "false Oswald" (i.e., prior to the assassination, an Oswald lookalike was seen around Dallas engaging in activities that implicated the "real" Oswald). Fellow researcher Sylvia Meagher told Weisberg in a letter that the plagiarism accusation was unfounded, given how "parallel discovery and reasoning...is widespread among critics of the WR and almost inevitable." John Kelin commented, "this was not the first time he had lashed out at other critics, and it was a cause of some concern for Sylvia; she was beginning to think Weisberg suffered from a persecution complex."

After having cooperated with Jim Garrison in the late 1960s, Weisberg developed an animus toward the former New Orleans DA, and wrote that his "proliferating conspiracy theories mislead and confuse as much or more than the faulted official conclusions." Weisberg sought to undermine Oliver Stone's 1991 JFK film about Garrison, leaking a pirated draft of the screenplay to "unfriendly" Washington Post journalist George Lardner, who used it to attack Stone's film months before it was released. In a letter to The Washington Post, Weisberg labeled JFK a "monumental piece of disinformation".

=== Later years ===
In Weisberg's later years, his assassination research work was curtailed by health issues. He battled a kidney ailment, diabetes, and sepsis. In 1989 he had open-heart surgery. He did manage to produce two final books: Case Open (1994)—a rebuttal to Gerald Posner's bestseller, Case Closed: Lee Harvey Oswald and the Assassination of JFK (1993)—and Never Again! The Government Conspiracy in the JFK Assassination (1995).

On February 21, 2002, Harold Weisberg died of cardiovascular disease at his home in Frederick, Maryland. He was 88.

== Media appearances ==
With his reputation as an assassination expert, Weisberg was a guest commentator in documentary films and TV programs. He was interviewed in the documentaries, The Men Who Killed Kennedy (1988), Reasonable Doubt: The Single-Bullet Theory and the Assassination of John F. Kennedy (1988), and The JFK Assassination: The Jim Garrison Tapes (1992). In Season 5 of the TV series Unsolved Mysteries, Weisberg appeared as himself in an episode about the King assassination.

== Harold Weisberg Archive ==
In 1992, Weisberg decided to leave his voluminous assassination research files to Hood College in Frederick, Maryland. The documents were scanned and digitized and made available for other researchers at the Harold Weisberg Archive website.

== Publications ==
=== Books ===
- Whitewash: The Report on the Warren Report. New York: Dell. 1966 [1965]. ASIN B0007DT7AO. OCLC 921336.
- Whitewash II: The FBI-Secret Service Cover Up. Hyattstown, Maryland: Weisberg. 1966. OCLC 1245472.
- Photographic Whitewash: Suppressed Kennedy Assassination Pictures. Hyattstown, Maryland: Weisberg. 1967. LCCN 68003491. Republished by Skyhorse in 2013 under the title, Whitewash III: The Photographic Whitewash of the JFK Assassination.
- Oswald in New Orleans: Case for Conspiracy with the C.I.A. New York: Canyon Books. 1967. ISBN 978-1626360587. Foreword by Jim Garrison.
- Frame-Up: The Martin Luther King/James Earl Ray Case. Outerbridge & Dienstfrey. 1971. ISBN 978-0876900321. Republished by Carroll & Graf in 1993 with a postscript by James Earl Ray.
- Whitewash IV: JFK Top Secret Assassination Transcript. Frederick, Maryland: Weisberg. 1974. ISBN 978-0911606072. Includes a legal analysis by Jim Lesar.
- Post Mortem: JFK Assassination Cover-Up Smashed!. Frederick, Maryland: Weisberg. 1975. LCCN 76356397.
- Martin Luther King: The Assassination. New York: Carroll & Graf. 1993. ISBN 978-0881849943. This was a reissue of Frame-Up under a new title.
- Selections from Whitewash. New York: Carroll & Graf. 1993. ISBN 978-0786700165.
- Case Open: The Omissions, Distortions and Falsifications of Case Closed. New York: Carroll & Graf. 1994. ISBN 978-0786700981.
- Never Again! The Government Conspiracy in the JFK Assassination. New York: Carroll & Graf. 1995. ISBN 978-0786702060.

=== Manuscripts ===
- A Citizen's Descent. 52 p.

=== Articles ===
- "Darken Your House for... More Docule Birds Less Cannibalism". Everybody's Poultry Magazine (October 1962): 9, 11, 36.
- "Hysteria in Meat-Tyoe Birds". Everybody's Poultry Magazine (December 1962): 9–10, 35.

=== Book reviews ===
- Review of Reinhold Niebuhr, His Religious, Social and Political Thought by Charles Kegley and Robert W. Bretall. Jewish Social Studies, vol. 18, no. 3 (1956): 224–226. JSTOR 4465463.

=== Speeches ===
- "Looking Backward to Look Ahead." Frederick, Maryland (April 20, 1975)
- "New JFK Assassination Evidence." University of Maryland (June 13, 1975)

=== Testimony ===
- Testimony, with Jim Garrison. Grand Jury Proceedings Special Investigations. Orleans Parish Grand Jury (April 28, 1967)

=== Other ===
- Film script for "JFK" (1st version) by Oliver Stone and Zachary Sklar.

This item has been digitized from Oliver Stone's personal copy of the first version of the film script, and it contains handwritten notes from Harold Weisberg.

== See also ==
- Mary Ferrell
