= Mary Ferrell =

American historian

Mary Elizabeth McHughes Ferrell (26 October 1922 – 20 February 2004) was an American historian and independent researcher who created a large database on the John F. Kennedy assassination.

== Life and career ==
Born in Memphis, Tennessee, she married Hubert Afton "Buck" Ferrell (1919–1998), in 1940 and had four children. In 1957 the family moved to Dallas, Texas, where Ferrell worked as a legal secretary, for more than thirty years, at a law firm and at the office of the Governor of Texas in Austin.

- Mary Ferrell, in her JFK library
- 31 December 1972 - Associated Press
- 2 November 1983 - Associated Press
- undated © Fort Worth Star-Telegram, used by permission, by John C. McAdams

She began collecting materials on the Kennedy assassination immediately after the event. Her assassination database was originally written on over 40,000 cards and included details of over 8,200 people involved in the case. These data were eventually entered into a computer. Ferrell also created a four-volume set of chronologies, covering all aspects of the assassination.

She was interviewed for the program JFK: The Day the Dream Died, aired by WFAA-TV in 1983.

Ferrell died, 20 February 2004, at age 81, in Dallas.

== Foundation ==
The Mary Ferrell Foundation Inc.
- Founder: Rex Bradford
- Type: 501(c)(3) organization
- Tax ID no.: 04-3565424
- Headquarters: Ipswich, Massachusetts
- Website: maryferrell.org

The Mary Ferrell Foundation, named for Mary Elizabeth McHughes Ferrell (26 October 1922 – 20 February 2004), is a non-profit, located in Ipswich, Massachusetts. Topics include the 1960s assassinations, the Watergate scandal, and post-Watergate intelligence abuse.

Rex Bradford, a computer game designer (Star Wars: The Empire Strikes Back, Star Wars: Jedi Arena, Mean 18, Drac's Night Out, and British Open Championship Golf), holds the offices of President, Treasurer, and Clerk and developed the Mary Ferrell Foundation website, and the History-Matters.com website. Bradford is vice-president of the Assassination Archives and Research Center.

Documents held or online include the collection of Mary Ferrell, other private contributors, and copies of other collections.

MaryFerrell.org provides a CIA cryptonym Database with search and autocomplete lookup of CIA Cryptonyms.

== Authored works ==
- (with Robert Chapman) Introduction to Shaw, J. Gary; Harris, Larry R. (1992). Cover-up: The Governmental Conspiracy to Conceal the Facts about the Public Execution of John Kennedy (second ed.). Collector's Editions.

== See also ==
- Harold Weisberg
