= JMWAVE =

US CIA mission to overthrow Fidel Castro

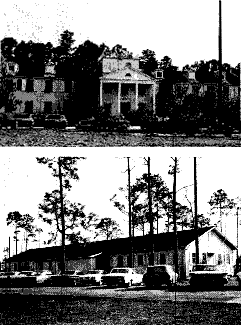
JMWAVE buildings in Miami, c. 1961, from CIA archives

JMWAVE or JM/WAVE or JM WAVE was the codename for a major secret United States covert operations and intelligence gathering station operated by the Central Intelligence Agency (CIA) from 1961 until 1968. It was headquartered in Building 25 at the former Naval Air Station Richmond, an airship base in Miami, about 12 miles south of the main campus of the University of Miami on what is the university's present-day South Campus.

The intelligence facility was also referred to as the CIA's "Miami Station" or "Wave Station."

== History ==
JMWAVE began as the operations center for Task Force W, the CIA's unit dedicated to Operation Mongoose, an extensive campaign of terrorist attacks against civilians in Cuba carried out by the U.S. as part of an effort to overthrow Fidel Castro's Communist government. JMWAVE was also active in some form during the failed U.S.-sponsored Bay of Pigs invasion of Cuba in April 1961. The JMWAVE operation grew out of an earlier fledgling CIA office in Coral Gables.

The station's activities escalated, reaching their peak in late 1962 and early 1963 around the Cuban Missile Crisis. Under Theodore Shackley's leadership from 1962 to 1965, JMWAVE grew to be the largest CIA station in the world outside of the organization's headquarters in Langley, Virginia, with 300 to 400 professional operatives and possibly including about 100 based in Cuba and an estimated 15,000 anti-Castro Cuban exiles on its payroll. The CIA was one of Miami's largest employers during this period. Exiles were trained in commando tactics, espionage and seamanship and the station supported numerous exile raids on Cuba.

The main front company for JMWAVE was "Zenith Technical Enterprises, Inc." In addition, about 300 to 400 other front companies were created throughout South Florida with a large range of safe houses, cover businesses, and other properties. With an annual budget of approximately $50 million (equivalent to $540 million in 2025) the station had a major impact on the economy of South Florida, creating a local economic boom, particularly in the real estate, banking, and certain manufacturing sectors. It also operated a fleet of aircraft and boats that was the third-largest navy in the Caribbean at the time after the U.S. Navy and the Cuban Revolutionary Navy. JMWAVE's activities were so widespread that they became an open secret amongst local Florida government and law enforcement agencies.

On June 26, 1964, Look magazine published an exposé by David Wise and Thomas B. Ross which revealed that Zenith was a CIA front. University of Miami authorities denied knowledge of the CIA operation, though Shackley claimed privately that University President Henry King Stanford was fully aware of it, and JMWAVE changed its main front company name from Zenith to Melmar Corporation.

By 1968, JMWAVE became increasingly obsolete, and concerns emerged that the CIA station would become a public embarrassment to the University of Miami. Consequently, it was deactivated and replaced with a substantially smaller station at Miami Beach.

As of 2004, the facilities on the Richmond Naval Air Station site were still used by several U.S. government agencies, including the CIA's Foreign Broadcast Information Service, the United States Air Force, and the United States Army. Several original JMWAVE buildings are still standing. As of 2007, a local government effort was focused on converting Building 25 to a military museum and memorial.
