= Shane O'Sullivan (filmmaker) =

Irish writer and filmmaker

- Born: 1969 (age 56–57)
- Occupation: Filmmaker

Shane O'Sullivan (born 1969) is an Irish writer and filmmaker based in London. He is best known for his work on the assassination of Robert Kennedy. His feature documentary RFK Must Die is the first theatrical documentary on the case since Ted Charach's The Second Gun, which was released in October 1973. His book on the case, Who Killed Bobby? The Unsolved Murder of Robert F. Kennedy was published by Union Square Press to coincide with the fortieth anniversary of the assassination on 5 June 2008.

His second feature documentary, Children of the Revolution, tells the stories of Ulrike Meinhof and Fusako Shigenobu, leaders of the German Red Army Faction and the Japanese Red Army, and premiered at IDFA in 2010. It was released in thirty cinemas across Japan in 2014. His third feature, Killing Oswald, was released in 2013, on the fiftieth anniversary of the JFK assassination.

His most recent book, Dirty Tricks: Nixon, Watergate and the CIA, was published in 2018 by Skyhorse Publishing.
