= Jefferson Morley =

American independent journalist and author

Jefferson Morley is an American independent journalist and author. He has written a number of books about American history, particularly the history of the CIA and the assassination of John F. Kennedy.

Morley grew up in Minneapolis and attended Yale University. His grandfather is Felix Morley. He worked for The New Republic, and later as a Washington Post writer for 15 years. He has also written for Salon and The Intercept.

In 2007, he became the national editorial director of the Center for Independent Media. As of 2022, Morley was vice-president of the Mary Ferrell Foundation. He is the editor of the substack blog "JFK Facts". He was interviewed for the 2021 documentary JFK Revisited: Through the Looking Glass. In 2025 he testified at the first hearing of the House Oversight Committee's "Task Force on the Declassification of Federal Secrets".

== Books ==
- Morley, Jefferson (2008). Our Man in Mexico: Winston Scott and the Hidden History of the CIA. University Press of Kansas. ISBN 978-0-700-61571-1.
- Stanley, Lawrence A.; Morley, Jefferson, eds. (1992). Rap: The Lyrics. New York: Penguin. ISBN 978-0-14-014788-9.
- Morley, Jefferson (2012). Snow-Storm in August: Washington City, Francis Scott Key, and the Forgotten Race Riot of 1835. New York: Nan A. Talese/Doubleday. ISBN 978-0-385-53337-9. OCLC 757466911.
- Morley, Jefferson (2017). The Ghost: The Secret Life of CIA Spymaster James Jesus Angleton. New York: St. Martin's Press. ISBN 978-1-250-08061-5.
- Morley, Jefferson (2022). Scorpions' Dance: The President, the Spymaster, and Watergate. New York: St. Martin's Press. ISBN 978-1-250-27583-7.
