= Helge Boes =

German American intelligence officer (1970-2003)

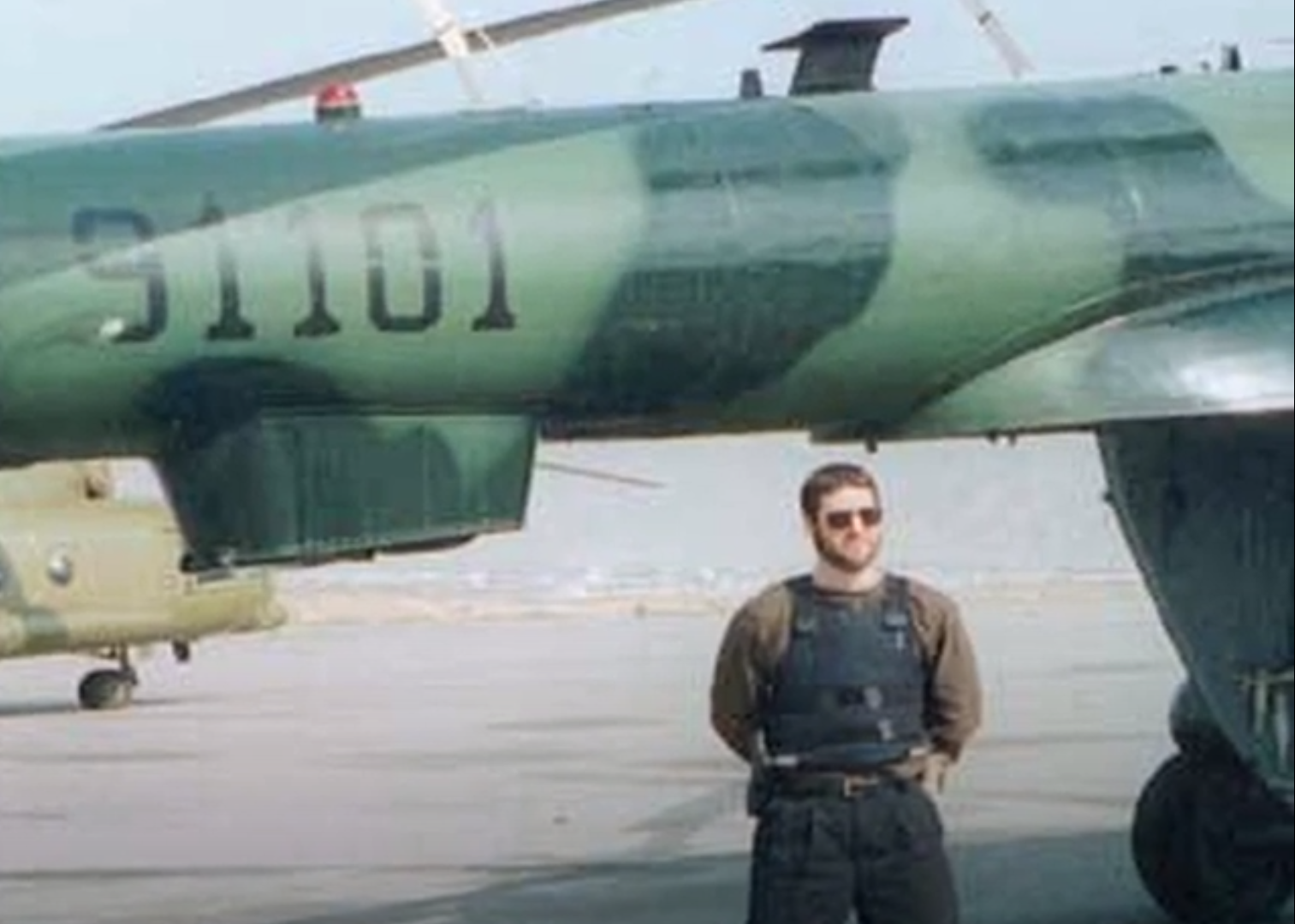
- Boes in Afghanistan with the famed Mi-17 helicopter assigned tail number 91101.
- Born: Helge Philipp Boes; June 20, 1970; Hamburg, West Germany
- Died: February 5, 2003 (aged 32); Eastern Afghanistan
- Monuments: CIA Memorial Wall (star)
- Citizenship: West Germany (–1990); United States (c.1990–)
- Education: John F. Kennedy School, Berlin; Georgia State University (B.A.); Harvard Law School (J.D.)
- Occupations: Attorney, intelligence officer
- Employer: Central Intelligence Agency
- Spouse: Cindy E. Tidler
- Awards: Exceptional Service Medallion

Helge Phillipp Boes (June 20, 1970 – February 5, 2003) was a German American intelligence officer and lawyer who was killed in Afghanistan while working for the Central Intelligence Agency (CIA) early in the Global War on Terrorism.

== Early life and education ==
On Jun 20, 1970, Helge Boes was born in Hamburg, West Germany, to American Roderich Boes and German Monika Boes. The family moved to West Berlin when he was two, and life in the walled city surrounded by Communist East Germany allowed him "to see up close the damaging effects of a closed society,” his older brother Henrik told Reuters in 2003. Boes attended John F. Kennedy School, a German-American elementary and high school where he excelled in football, graduating in 1989.

In 1989, Boes moved to Kennesaw, Georgia, and enrolled at Georgia State University. He graduated summa cum laude in 1992. He then entered Harvard Law School, graduating cum laude in 1997 alongside his future wife, Cindy E. Tidler. The two married in 1999.

== Legal career ==
Following graduation from law school, Boes joined the white shoe law firm Latham & Watkins, where he worked as a staff attorney until, 2001, when he decided to give up the legal profession to join the CIA.

== CIA career ==
Joining the Central Intelligence Agency as a member of the Directorate of Operations Clandestine Service Trainee Class, Boes immediately excelled in training. According to his biography on the CIA's website, "he was a standout among the trainees of our Clandestine Service", adding "one of Helge’s ops instructors called him "a case officer’s case officer." DO officers know how high a compliment that is."

Following training, Boes was assigned to the Counterterrorist Center (CTC), and in Spring 2002 made himself one of the earliest volunteers for assignment to Afghanistan. After a successful first tour in the nascent war, Boes returned to headquarters for a few months, but by early 2003 he volunteered for a second assignment to Afghanistan.

=== Death in Afghanistan ===
On February 5, 2003, 32-year-old Boes was killed in eastern Afghanistan during a live-fire training exercise when a grenade detonated prematurely, killing him and wounding two others. He was the second CIA officer to die as part of Operation Enduring Freedom, the first being paramilitary officer Mike Spann on November 25, 2001. Boes death in the line of duty, the 80th since the inception of the agency - was announced to the CIA headquarters workforce on February 7th - at which time CIA Director George Tenet posthumously awarded Boes the Exceptional Service Medallion.

"For the life Helge led, one of courage and sacrifice, one of service without public reward—he has earned the gratitude of every American family." — George Tenet

== Legacy ==
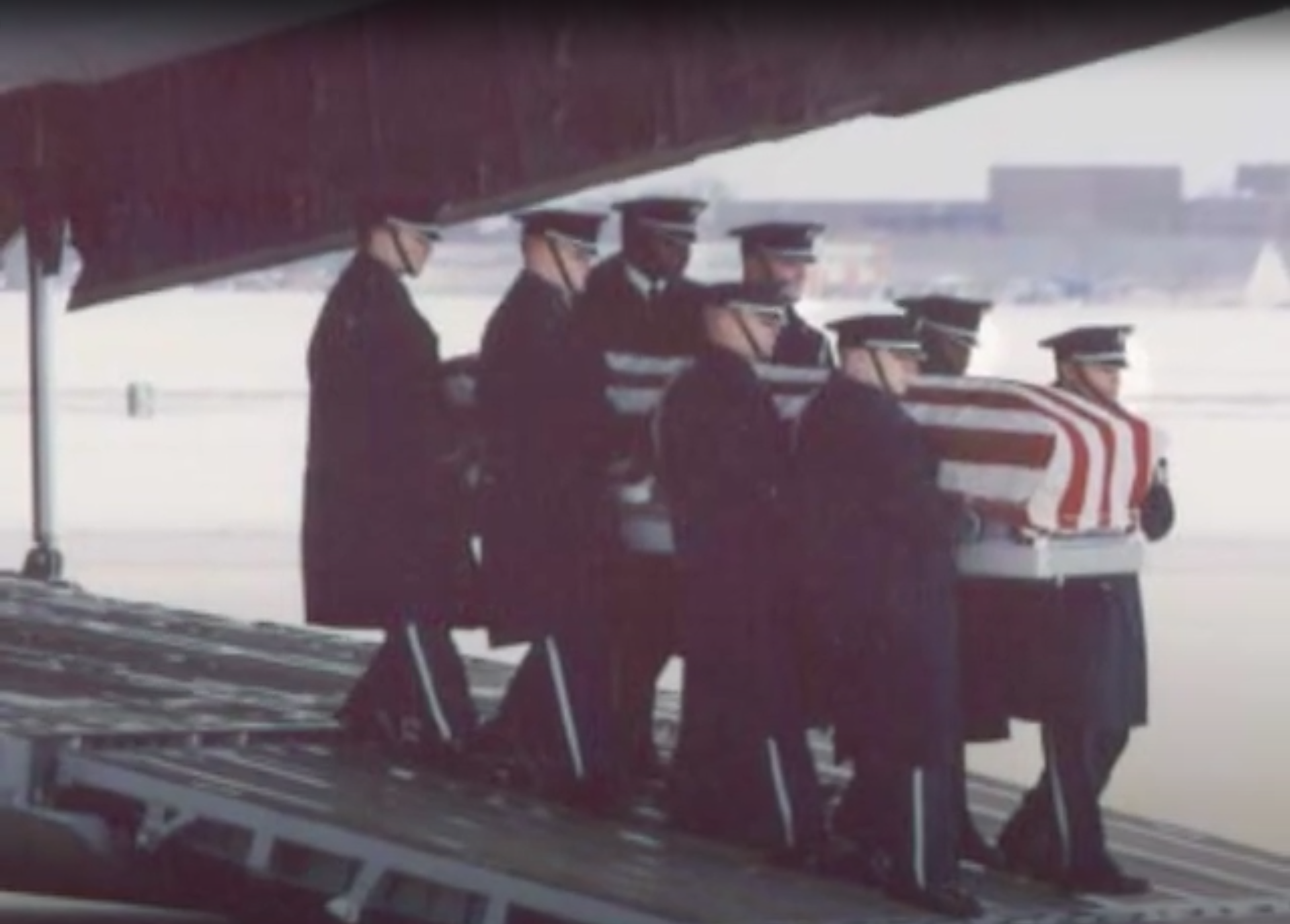
The repatriation of Boes' remains to the United States in February 2003

Boes was survived by his wife, Cindy Tidler, his parents, Roderich and Monika Boes of Germany, and his brother Henrik of Colorado. He was given a Catholic funeral at Christ the Redeemer Catholic Church in Sterling, Virginia, with CIA Director Tenet giving a eulogy.

Boes was memorialized with the 92nd star etched into the CIA Memorial Wall.

The Washington Premier League, the United States Adult Soccer Association affiliate serving the Washington DC metropolitan area with which Boes used to play goalkeeper, has hosted the Helge Boes Cup as the championship match for the Premier Division annually since 2012.

According to Reuters, Boes and fellow Harvard Law class of 1997 member Michael E. Weston were best friends during and after law school, and both found private legal practice unfulfilling. They also loved the same woman, Harvard Law classmate Cindy Tidler. Tidler and Boes married in 1999. Six years after Boes' death in 2003, she married Weston, who was killed in a helicopter crash in Afghanistan five months later while working for the DEA, the War in Afghanistan ultimately widowing her twice.
