= Richard Fecteau =

CIA agent held prisoner in China 1952-1971

Richard G. Fecteau
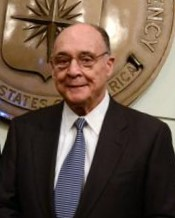
- Fecteau at CIA headquarters in 2013
- Born: 1927 (age 98–99); Lynn, Massachusetts, U.S.
- Education: Boston University
- Occupation: CIA officer (1949–1971)
- Known for: 19 years as a POW in China
- Awards: Exceptional Service Medallion; Distinguished Intelligence Medal; CIA Director's Medal; Distinguished Intelligence Cross

Richard G. Fecteau (born 1927) is an American Central Intelligence Agency operative who was captured by the People's Republic of China during a CIA-sponsored flight in the Korean War. News of the capture of Fecteau and John T. Downey reached the United States in November 1954, sparking a nearly two decade battle of wills between the U.S. and the PRC. Fecteau was released in December 1971. He later worked as an assistant athletic director at his alma mater, Boston University, retiring in 1989.

== CIA career ==
He joined the Central Intelligence Agency (CIA) soon after Boston University and became one of two CIA Paramilitary Officers in Special Activities Division (the other was John T. Downey, a Yale graduate) who survived the shoot-down of their Civil Air Transport C-47 spy-collection mission over the People's Republic of China in November 1952. In December 1954 Radio Peking announced that Fecteau and Downey had been convicted of spying and were sentenced to 20 years and life imprisonment respectively.

Due to improving U.S.-China relations, Fecteau and Mary Ann Harbert, who was captured on a yacht in Chinese waters near Hong Kong in April 1968, were released on 13 December 1971, crossing the land border into Hong Kong where they were received by U.S. consular officials. Harbert and Fecteau were flown by helicopter to Kai Tak Airport and then boarded a United States Air Force aeromedical evacuation jet and flown to Clark Air Base, Hawaii and then on to McGuire Air Force Base.

Harbert and Fecteau were taken to Valley Forge Military Hospital for medical evaluation. Fecteau was reported to be having difficulty adjusting to his release, being uncommunicative after having spent most of the preceding 19 years in solitary confinement.

Throughout his captivity the U.S. had falsely denied that he was a CIA agent. On hearing news of his release, his ex-wife Margaret (who had divorced him in 1951) admitted that "the Chinese haven't been lying" about his being a CIA agent, but she recanted the statement the next day. However U.S. officials disclosed privately that they no longer denied the Chinese charges that he was a spy. In a press conference on 15 December he said that he had never given up hope of release, but had gotten so used to solitary confinement that he was unused to speaking, when asked if he was a CIA agent he replied "no comment."

In an official statement made by Xinhua News Agency at the time of his release, the Chinese government said that while Fecteau was a CIA spy, given that he had admitted his crimes during trial and his behavior was not bad, in accordance with the proletarian policy of leniency he was being released prior to the end of his 20-year sentence.

In 2013, the CIA awarded Fecteau the Distinguished Intelligence Cross. The CIA's Studies in Intelligence, vol. 50, no. 4, 2006 included an article describing the mission, the capture, and, ultimately, the release of agents Downey and Fecteau. A related video documentary was placed on the CIA website.
