= Special Activities Center =

Covert and paramilitary unit of the CIA

- Directorate of Operations seal
- Active: 2016–present (as Special Activities Center); Unknown/1947–2016 (as Special Activities Division)
- Country: United States
- Type: Clandestine and Covert operations
- Size: Classified
- Part of: Central Intelligence Agency; Directorate of Operations
- Garrison/HQ: George Bush Center for Intelligence; Langley, Virginia, U.S.
- Motto: Tertia Optio (English: "Third Option")
- Known operations: Cold War; Permesta; Bay of Pigs Invasion; Vietnam War; Operation Condor; Operation Cyclone; Operation Restore Hope; Operation Eagle Claw; Global war on terrorism; War in Afghanistan; Iraq War; 2008 Abu Kamal raid; Operation Inherent Resolve; Operation Enduring Freedom – Horn of Africa; Drone strikes in Pakistan; Operation Neptune Spear

Commanders
- President of the United States: Donald Trump
- Director of the Central Intelligence Agency: John Ratcliffe
- Deputy Director of CIA for Operations: Aaron Wegert

The Special Activities Center (SAC) is the center (Note: A "Center" or "Mission Center" in the CIA is a crossfunctional level of organization. The CIA is divided into five major directorates, and several functionally oriented centers including the Special Activities Center. The major difference between a Directorate and Centers within the CIA is that the centers bring together people from all five CIA directorates and include officers from other intelligence agencies.) of the United States Central Intelligence Agency (CIA) responsible for covert operations. The clandestine specialized unit was named Special Activities Division (SAD) prior to a 2015 reorganization. Within SAC there are at least two separate groups (Note: A "Group" within the CIA is an organizational level that is subordinate to a Division or Center. Groups consist of "Branches", typically sharing similar functional, geographic, or close organizational links.): SAC/SOG (Special Operations Group) for tactical paramilitary operations and SAC/PAG (Political Action Group) for covert political action. The Special Operations Group is further subdivided into Departments (Note: A "Department" within the CIA is an organizational level infrequently used to represent an echelon subordinate to a transnational Group but with broader scope and authority than a Branch.) (formerly Branches (Note: A "Branch" within the CIA is an organizational level subordinate to either a transnational or regional Group; historically some Divisions within the Clandestine Service were also subdivided directly into Branches.)), of which at least four are known: Ground Department (formerly known as Ground Branch) handling land operations, Maritime Department (formerly Maritime Branch) handling sea operations, Air Department (formerly Air Branch) handling air operations and covered air, and Armor and Special Programs Department (formerly Armor and Special Programs Branch) which is responsible for development and procurement of weapons and armor systems.

The Special Operations Group is responsible for operations that include clandestine or covert operations with which the US government does not want to be overtly associated. As such, unit members, called Paramilitary Operations Officers and Specialized Skills Officers, do not typically wear uniforms. If they are compromised during a mission, the US government may deny all knowledge. The group generally recruits personnel from special mission units within the U.S. special operations community.

The Political Action Group is responsible for covert activities related to political influence, psychological operations, economic warfare, and cyberwarfare.Covert political and influence operations are used to support US foreign policy. As overt support for one element of an insurgency can be counterproductive due to the unfavorable impression of the United States in some countries, in such cases covert assistance allows the US to assist without damaging the reputation of its beneficiaries.

SOG Paramilitary Operations Officers account for a majority of Distinguished Intelligence Cross and Intelligence Star recipients during conflicts or incidents that elicited CIA involvement. These are the highest two awards for valor within the CIA in recognition of distinguished valor and excellence in the line of duty. SOG operatives also account for the majority of the stars displayed on the Memorial Wall at CIA headquarters, indicating that the officer died while on active duty. The Latin motto of SAC is Tertia Optio, which means "Third Option", as covert action represents an additional option within the realm of national security when diplomacy and military action are not feasible.

== Overview ==
SAC provides the United States National Security Council with alternative options when overt military and/or diplomatic actions are not viable or politically feasible. SAC can be directly tasked by the U.S. president or the National Security Council at the president's direction, unlike other U.S. special mission forces. SAC/SOG has far fewer members than most of the other special missions units, such as the U.S. Army's 1st Special Forces Operational Detachment-Delta (Delta Force) or Naval Special Warfare Development Group (DEVGRU). SAC is lead by a director (D/SAC), whose identity is classified.

As the action arm of the CIA's Directorate of Operations, SAC/SOG conducts direct action missions such as raids, ambushes, sabotage, targeted killings and unconventional warfare (e.g., training and leading guerrilla and military units of other countries in combat) as an irregular military force. SAC/SOG also conducts special reconnaissance that can be either military or intelligence driven and is carried out by Paramilitary Officers (also called Paramilitary Operatives or Paramilitary Operations Officers) when in "non-permissive environments". Paramilitary Operations Officers are also fully trained case officers (i.e., "spy handlers") and as such conduct clandestine human intelligence (HUMINT) operations throughout the world.

The political action group within SAC conducts the deniable psychological operations, also known as black propaganda, as well as "covert influence" to induce political change in other countries as part of United States foreign policy. Covert intervention in foreign elections is the most significant form of SAC's political action. This involves financial support for favored candidates, media guidance, technical support for public relations, get-out-the-vote or political organizing efforts, legal expertise, advertising campaigns, assistance with poll-watching, and other means of direct action. Policy decisions are influenced by agents, such as subverted officials of the country, to make decisions in their official capacity that are in the furtherance of U.S. policy aims. In addition, mechanisms for forming and developing opinions involve the covert use of propaganda.

Propaganda includes leaflets, newspapers, magazines, books, radio, and television, all of which are geared to convey the U.S. message appropriate to the region. These techniques have expanded to cover the internet as well. They may employ officers to work as journalists, recruit agents of influence, operate media platforms, plant certain stories or information in places it is hoped will come to public attention, or seek to deny and/or discredit information that is public knowledge. In all such propaganda efforts, "black" operations denote those in which the audience is to be kept ignorant of the source; "white" efforts are those in which the originator openly acknowledges themselves, and "gray" operations are those in which the source is partly but not fully acknowledged.

Some examples of political action programs were the prevention of the Italian Communist Party (PCI) from winning elections between 1948 and the late 1960s; overthrowing the governments of Iran in 1953 and Guatemala in 1954; arming rebels in Indonesia in 1957; and providing funds and support to the trade union federation Solidarity following the imposition of martial law in Poland after 1981.

SAC's existence became better known as a result of the "war on terror". Beginning in autumn of 2001, SAC/SOG paramilitary teams arrived in Afghanistan to hunt down al-Qaeda leaders, facilitate the entry of U.S. Army Special Forces, and lead the United Islamic Front for the Salvation of Afghanistan against the ruling Taliban. SAC/SOG units also defeated Ansar al-Islam in Iraqi Kurdistan prior to the invasion of Iraq in 2003, and trained, equipped, organized and led the Kurdish peshmerga forces to defeat the Iraqi Army in northern Iraq. Numerous books have been published on the exploits of CIA paramilitary officers, including Conboy and Morrison's Feet to the Fire: CIA Covert Operations in Indonesia, 1957–1958, and Warner's Shooting at the Moon: The Story of America's Clandestine War in Laos. Most experts consider SAC/SOG the premier force for unconventional warfare (UW), whether that warfare consists of either creating or combating an insurgency in a foreign country.

United States Special Operations Command Insignia

There remains some conflict between the CIA's Directorate of Operations and the more clandestine parts of the United States Special Operations Command (USSOCOM), such as the Joint Special Operations Command. This is usually confined to the civilian/political heads of the respective Department/Agency. The combination of SAC and USSOCOM units has resulted in some of the more prominent actions of the wars in Iraq and Afghanistan, including the locating and killing of Osama bin Laden. SAC/SOG has several missions, one being the recruiting, training, and leading of indigenous forces in combat operations. SAC/SOG and its successors have been used when it was considered desirable to have plausible deniability about US support (this is called a covert operation or "covert action"). Unlike other special missions units, SAC/SOG operatives combine special operations and clandestine intelligence capabilities in one individual. These individuals can operate in any environment (sea, air or ground) with limited to no support.

== Covert action ==
The CIA is authorized to collect intelligence, conduct counterintelligence, and conduct covert action by the National Security Act of 1947. President Ronald Reagan issued Executive Order 12333 titled "United States Intelligence Activities" in 1984. This order defined covert action as "special activities," both political and military, that the U.S. government would deny, and granted the exclusive authority to conduct such operations to the CIA. The CIA was also designated as the sole authority under the 1991 Intelligence Authorization Act and mirrored in Title 50 of the United States Code Section 413(e). The CIA must have a presidential finding in order to conduct these activities under the Hughes-Ryan amendment to the 1991 Intelligence Authorization Act. These findings are monitored by the oversight committees in both the U.S. Senate, called the Senate Select Committee on Intelligence (SSCI) and the U.S. House of Representatives, called the House Permanent Select Committee on Intelligence (HPSCI).

The Pentagon commissioned a study to determine whether the CIA or the U.S. Department of Defense (DoD) should conduct covert action paramilitary operations. Their study determined that the CIA should maintain this capability and be the "sole government agency conducting covert action." The DoD found that it does not have the legal authority to conduct covert action or the operational agility to carry out these types of missions.

In an article for ABC News, former Deputy Secretary of Defense and retired CIA paramilitary officer Mick Mulroy explained that the term "covert action" is derived from Presidential Findings authorizing the CIA to conduct specific special activities to support U.S. national security objectives. He advocated for covert actions to be fully incorporated in the U.S. National Security Strategy and the 2018 National Defense Strategy in the form of a Covert Action Annex and for covert actions to be fully funded to operate in support of overall objectives in the form of a Covert Action Fund.

== Selection and training ==
Emblem of the Joint Special Operations Command

Special Activities Center has several hundred officers, mostly former members from Tier 1 units like SEAL Team Six and Delta Force, as well as other U.S. Special Operations Forces personnel. The CIA has also recruited individuals from within the agency. The CIA's formal designations for these individuals are paramilitary operations officers and specialized skills officers. Paramilitary operations officers often attend the Clandestine Service Trainee (CST) program, which trains them as clandestine intelligence operatives at an internal paramilitary training course.

The primary strengths of SAC paramilitary officers are operational agility, adaptability, and deniability. They often operate in small teams, typically made up of two to ten operatives (with some operations being carried out by a single officer), all usually with extensive military tactical experience and a set of specialized skills that does not exist in any other unit. As fully trained intelligence case officers, paramilitary operations officers possess all the clandestine skills to collect human intelligence – and most importantly – to recruit assets from among the indigenous troops receiving their training. These officers often operate in remote locations behind enemy lines to carry out direct action (including raids and sabotage), counter-intelligence, guerrilla/unconventional warfare, counter-terrorism, and hostage rescue missions, in addition to being able to conduct espionage via HUMINT assets.

There are four principal departments within SAC's Special Operations Group, formerly called branches: the Air Department, the Maritime Department, the Ground Department, and the Armor and Special Programs Department. The Armor and Special Programs Department is charged with the development, testing, and covert procurement of new personnel and vehicular armor, and maintenance of stockpiles of ordnance and weapons systems used by the SOG, almost all of which must be obtained from clandestine sources abroad, in order to provide SOG operatives and their foreign trainees with plausible deniability in accordance with U.S. congressional directives.

Together, the SAC/SOG comprises a complete combined arms covert paramilitary force. Paramilitary operations officers are the core of each department and routinely move between the departments to gain expertise in all aspects of SOG. As such, paramilitary operations officers are trained to operate in a multitude of environments. Because these officers are taken from the most highly trained units in the U.S. military and then provided with extensive additional training to become CIA clandestine intelligence officers, many U.S. security experts assess them as the most elite of the U.S. special missions units.

Paramilitary operations officers require a bachelor's degree to be considered for employment. SAC officers are trained at Camp Peary, Virginia (also known as "The Farm"), "The Point" (Harvey Point), a facility outside of Hertford, North Carolina, and at privately owned training centers around the United States. In addition to the eighteen months of training in the Clandestine Service Trainee (CST) program required to become a clandestine intelligence officer, paramilitary operations officers are trained to a high level of proficiency in:

- explosive devices and firearms (foreign and domestic)
- hand-to-hand combat
- high-performance / tactical driving (on and off-road)
- apprehension avoidance (including picking handcuffs and escaping from confinement)
- improvised explosive devices
- cyberwarfare
- covert channels
- HAHO / HALO parachuting
- combat and commercial SCUBA
- closed circuit diving
- proficiency in foreign languages
- surreptitious entry operations (picking or otherwise bypassing locks)
- vehicle hot-wiring
- Survival, Evasion, Resistance and Escape (SERE)
- extreme survival and wilderness training
- combat EMS medical training
- tactical communications
- tracking

== History ==
=== Office of Strategic Services ===
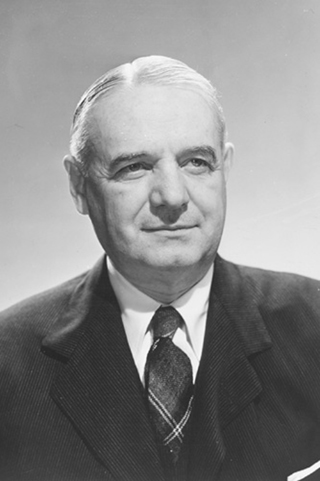
William Joseph Donovan

While the World War II Office of Strategic Services (OSS) was technically a military agency under the Joint Chiefs of Staff, in practice, it was fairly autonomous and enjoyed direct access to President Franklin D. Roosevelt. Major General William Joseph Donovan was the head of the OSS. Donovan was a soldier and Medal of Honor recipient from World War I. He was also a lawyer and former classmate of Roosevelt at Columbia Law School. Like its successor the CIA, the OSS included both human intelligence functions and special operations paramilitary functions. Its Secret Intelligence Division was responsible for espionage, while the Jedburgh teams, a U.S.-U.K.-French collaboration, were forerunners of groups that create guerrilla units, such as the U.S. Army Special Forces and the CIA. The OSS's Operational Groups were larger U.S. units that carried out direct action behind enemy lines. Even during World War II, the idea of intelligence and special operations units not under strict military control was controversial. The OSS operated primarily in the European Theater of Operations and to some extent in the China-Burma-India Theater, although General of the Army Douglas MacArthur was extremely reluctant to have any OSS personnel within his area of operations.

From 1943 to 1945, the OSS played a major role in training Kuomintang troops in China and Burma, and recruited other indigenous irregular forces for sabotage as well as guides for Allied forces in Burma fighting the Japanese army. OSS also helped arm, train and supply resistance movements, including Mao Zedong's People's Liberation Army in China and the Viet Minh in French Indochina, in areas occupied by the Axis powers. Other functions of the OSS included the use of propaganda, espionage, subversion, and post-war planning.

One of the OSS's greatest accomplishments during World War II was its penetration of Nazi Germany by OSS operatives. The OSS was responsible for training German and Austrian commandos for missions inside Nazi Germany. Some of these agents included exiled communists, socialist party members, labor activists, anti-Nazi POWs, and German and Jewish refugees. At the height of its influence during World War II, the OSS employed almost 24,000 people.

OSS Paramilitary Officers parachuted into many countries that were behind enemy lines, including France, Norway, Greece, and the Netherlands. In Crete, OSS paramilitary officers linked up with, equipped and fought alongside Greek resistance forces against the Axis occupation.

The OSS was disbanded shortly after World War II, with its intelligence analysis functions moving temporarily into the United States Department of State. Espionage and counterintelligence went into military units, while paramilitary and other covert action functions went into the Office of Policy Coordination set up in 1948. Between the CIA's original creation by the National Security Act of 1947 and various mergers and reorganizations through 1952, the wartime OSS functions generally ended up in the CIA. The mission of training and leading guerrillas in due course went to the United States Army Special Forces, but those missions required to remain covert were performed by the (Deputy) Directorate of Plans and its successor the Directorate of Operations of the CIA. In 1962, the CIA's paramilitary operations centralized in the Special Operations Division (SOD), the predecessor of the SAC. The direct descendant of the OSS' Special Operations is the CIA's Special Activities Division.

=== Tibet ===
After the Chinese invasion of Tibet in October 1950, the CIA inserted paramilitary (PM) teams into Tibet to train and lead Tibetan resistance fighters against the People's Liberation Army of China. These teams selected and then trained Tibetan soldiers in the Rocky Mountains of the United States; training occurred at Camp Hale. The PM teams then advised and led these commandos against the Chinese, both from Nepal and India and in some cases worked with Research and Analysis Wing. In addition, CIA Paramilitary Officers were responsible for the Dalai Lama's clandestine escape to India along with Indian intelligence, narrowly escaping capture by the People's Liberation Army.

According to a book by retired CIA officer John Kenneth Knaus, entitled Orphans Of The Cold War: America And The Tibetan Struggle For Survival, Gyalo Thondup, the older brother of the 14th Dalai Lama, sent the CIA five Tibetan recruits. These recruits were trained in paramilitary tactics on the island of Saipan in the Northern Marianas. Shortly thereafter, the five men were covertly returned to Tibet "to assess and organize the resistance" and selected another 300 Tibetans for training. U.S. assistance to the Tibetan resistance ceased after the 1972 Nixon visit to China, after which the United States and China normalized relations.

=== Korea ===
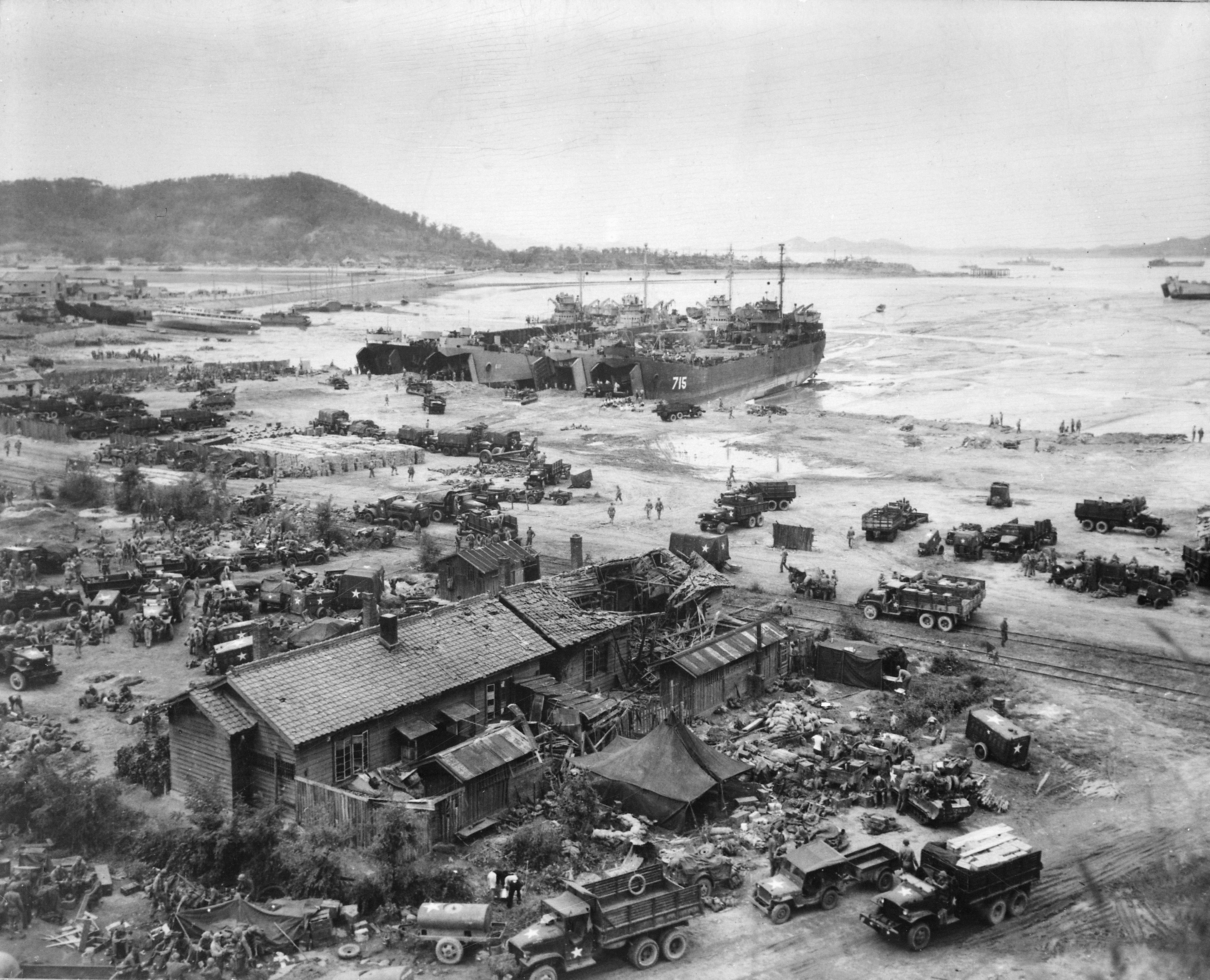
Battle of Incheon

The CIA sponsored a variety of activities during the Korean War. These activities included maritime operations behind North Korean lines. Yong Do Island, connected by a rugged isthmus to Pusan, served as the base for those operations. Well-trained Korean guerrillas carried out these operations. The four principal U.S. advisers responsible for the training and operational planning of those special missions were Dutch Kramer, Tom Curtis, George Atcheson, and Joe Pagnella. All of these Paramilitary Operations Officers operated through a CIA front organization called the Joint Advisory Commission, Korea (JACK), headquartered at Tongnae, a village near Pusan, on the peninsula's southeast coast. These paramilitary teams were responsible for numerous maritime raids and ambushes behind North Korean lines, as well as prisoner of war rescue operations.

These were the first maritime unconventional warfare units that trained indigenous forces as proxies. They also provided a model, along with the other CIA-sponsored ground-based, paramilitary Korean operations, for the Military Assistance Command, Vietnam – Studies and Observations Group (MACV-SOG) activities conducted by the U.S. military and the CIA/SOD (now Special Activities Center) in Vietnam. In addition, CIA paramilitary ground-based teams worked directly for U.S. military commanders, specifically with the 8th Army, on the "White Tiger" initiative. This initiative included inserting South Korean commandos and CIA Paramilitary Operations Officers prior to the two major amphibious assaults on North Korea, including the landing at Inchon.

=== Cuba (1961) ===
Map showing the location of the Bay of Pigs

The Bay of Pigs Invasion (known as "La Batalla de Girón," or "Playa Girón" in Cuba) was an unsuccessful attempt by a U.S.-trained force of Cuban exiles to invade southern Cuba and overthrow the Cuban government of Fidel Castro. The plan was launched in April 1961, less than three months after John F. Kennedy assumed the presidency of the United States. The Cuban Revolutionary Armed Forces, trained and equipped by Eastern Bloc nations, defeated the exile-combatants in three days.

The sea-borne invasion force landed on April 17, and fighting lasted until April 19, 1961. CIA Paramilitary Operations Officers Grayston Lynch and William "Rip" Robertson led the first assault on the beaches, and supervised the amphibious landings. Four American aircrew instructors from Alabama Air National Guard were killed while flying attack sorties. Various sources estimate Cuban Army casualties (killed or injured) to be in the thousands (between 2,000 and 5,000). This invasion followed the successful overthrow by the CIA of the Mosaddeq government in Iran in 1953 and Arbenz government in Guatemala in 1954, but was a failure both militarily and politically. Deteriorating Cuban-American relations were made worse by the 1962 Cuban Missile Crisis.

=== Bolivia ===
The National Liberation Army of Bolivia (ELN-Ejército de Liberación Nacional de Bolivia) was a communist guerrilla force that operated from the remote Ñancahuazú region against the pro-U.S. Bolivian government. They were joined by Che Guevara in the mid-1960s. The ELN was well equipped and scored a number of early successes against the Bolivian army in the difficult terrain of the mountainous Camiri region. In the late 1960s, the CIA deployed teams of Paramilitary Operations Officers to Bolivia to train the Bolivian army in order to counter the ELN. These teams linked up with U.S. Army Special Forces and Bolivian Special Forces to track down and capture Guevara, who was a special prize because of his leading role in the Cuban Revolution. On October 9, 1967, Guevara was executed by Bolivian soldiers on the orders of CIA Paramilitary Operations Officer Félix Rodríguez shortly after being captured, according to CIA documents.

=== Vietnam and Laos ===
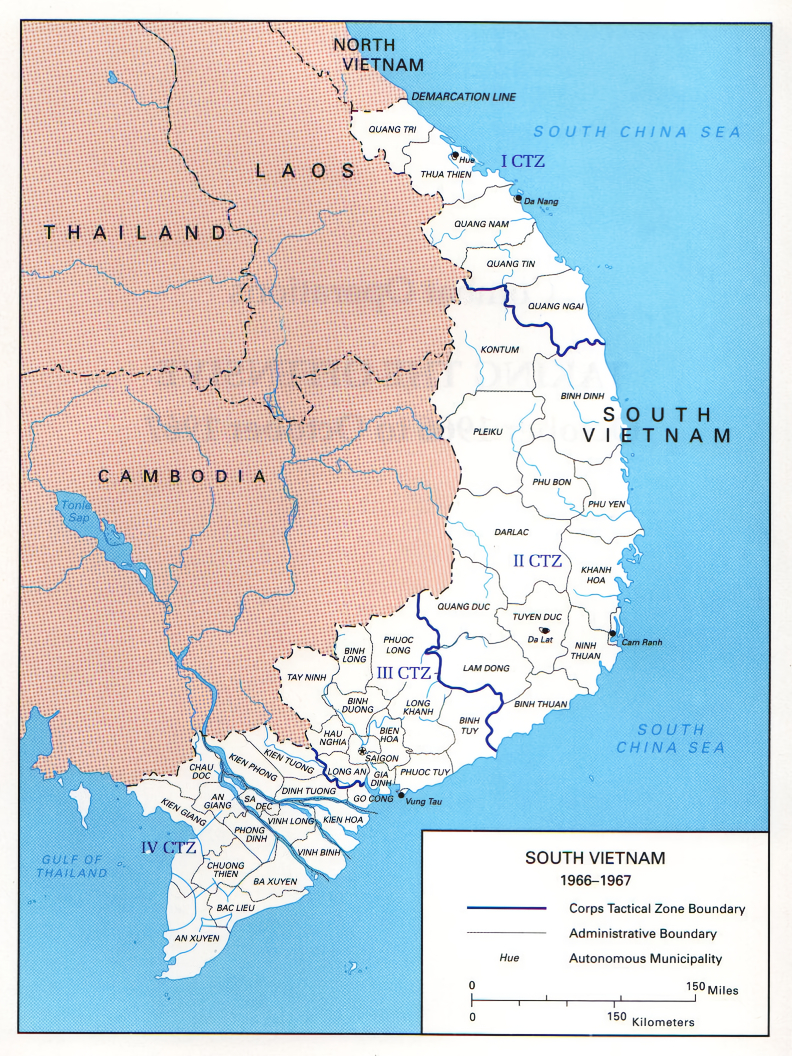
South Vietnam, Military Regions, 1967

The original OSS mission in Vietnam under Major Archimedes Patti was to work with Ho Chi Minh in order to prepare his forces to assist the United States and their Allies in fighting the Japanese. After the end of World War II, the U.S. agreed at Potsdam to turn Vietnam back to their previous French rulers, and in 1950 the U.S. began providing military aid to the French.

CIA Paramilitary Operations Officers trained and led Hmong tribesmen in Laos and Vietnam, and the actions of these officers were not known for several years. Air America was the air component of the CIA's paramilitary mission in Southeast Asia and was responsible for all combat, logistics and search and rescue operations in Laos and certain sections of Vietnam. The ethnic minority forces numbered in the tens of thousands. They conducted direct actions missions, led by Paramilitary Operations Officers, against the communist Pathet Lao forces and their North Vietnamese allies.

Elements of the Special Activities Division were seen in the CIA's Phoenix Program. One component of the Phoenix Program was involved in the capture and killing of suspected Viet Cong (VC) members. Between 1968 and 1972, the Phoenix Program captured 81,740 VC members, of whom 26,369 were killed. The program was also successful in destroying their infrastructure. By 1970, communist plans repeatedly emphasized attacking the government's "pacification" program and specifically targeted Phoenix agents. The VC also imposed quotas. In 1970, for example, communist officials near Da Nang in northern South Vietnam instructed their agents to "kill 400 persons" deemed to be government "tyrant[s]" and to "annihilate" anyone involved with the "pacification" program. Several North Vietnamese officials have made statements about the effectiveness of Phoenix.

MAC-V SOG (Studies and Observations Group, which was originally named the Special Operations Group, but was changed for cover purposes) was created and active during the Vietnam War. While the CIA was just one part of MAC-V SOG, it did have operational control of some of the programs. Many of the military members of MAC-V SOG joined the CIA after their military service. The legacy of MAC-V SOG continues within SAC's Special Operations Group.

On May 22, 2016, the CIA honored three paramilitary officers with stars on the memorial wall 56 years after their deaths. They were David W. Bevan, Darrell A. Eubanks, and John S. Lewis, all young men, killed on a mission to resupply anti-Communist forces in Laos. They were all recruited from the famous smokejumpers from Montana. One former smokejumper and paramilitary officer, Mike Oehlerich, believed he should have been on that flight, but they accidentally missed their pickup to the airport. They got stuck in Bangkok and so another crew – Bevan, Eubanks, and Lewis – flew that mission on August 13, 1961. "We had no idea anything happened until we got back the next day, and that's when they told us that they went into a canyon and tried to turn around and got into bad air," he said. CIA officials told him days after the crash that Lewis had jumped out of the plane, rather than remain inside. "When they told me that, I teared up," Oehlerich recalled. "It was something John and I had talked about – 'Don't go down with the airplane, your chances are better if you get out.'"

=== Maritime activities against the Soviet Union ===
In 1973, SAD and the CIA's Directorate of Science and Technology built and deployed the USNS Glomar Explorer (T-AG-193), a large deep-sea salvage ship, on a secret operation. This operation was called Project Azorian (erroneously called Project Jennifer by the press). Her mission was to recover a sunken Soviet submarine, K-129, which had been lost in April 1968. A mechanical failure caused two-thirds of the submarine to break off during recovery, but SAC recovered two nuclear-tipped torpedoes, cryptographic machines and the bodies of six Soviet submariners. An alternative theory claims that all of K-129 was recovered and that the official account was an "elaborate cover-up".

Also, in the 1970s, the U.S. Navy, the National Security Agency (NSA) and SAD conducted Operation Ivy Bells and a series of other missions to place wiretaps on Soviet underwater communications cables. These operations were covered in detail in the 1998 book Blind Man's Bluff: The Untold Story of American Submarine Espionage. In the 1985 edition of "Studies in Intelligence", the CIA's in-house journal that outsiders rarely get to see, the CIA describes the "staggering expense and improbable engineering feats" that culminated in the August 1974 mission.

=== Nicaragua ===
In 1979, the U.S.-backed Anastasio Somoza Debayle dictatorship in Nicaragua fell to the socialist Sandinistas. Once in power, the Sandinistas disbanded the Nicaraguan National Guard, who had committed many human rights abuses, and arrested and executed some of its members. Other former National Guard members helped to form the backbone of the Nicaraguan Counterrevolution or Contra. CIA paramilitary teams from Special Activities Division were deployed to train and lead these rebel forces against the Sandinista government. These paramilitary activities were based in Honduras and Costa Rica. Direct military aid by the United States was eventually forbidden by the Boland Amendment of the Defense Appropriations Act of 1983. The Boland Amendment was extended in October 1984 to forbid action by not only the Defense Department but also to include the Central Intelligence Agency.

The Boland Amendment was a compromise because the U.S. Democratic Party did not have enough votes for a comprehensive ban on military aid. It covered only appropriated funds spent by intelligence agencies. Some of Reagan's national security officials used non-appropriated money of the National Security Council (NSC) to circumvent the Amendment. NSC officials sought to arrange funding by third parties. These efforts resulted in the Iran-Contra Affair of 1987, which concerned Contra funding through the proceeds of arms sales to the Islamic Republic of Iran. No court ever made a determination whether Boland covered the NSC, and on the grounds that it was a prohibition rather than a criminal statute, no one was indicted for violating it. Congress later resumed aid to the Contras, totaling over $300 million. The Contra war ended when the Sandinistas were voted out of power by a war-weary populace in 1990. Sandinista leader Daniel Ortega was re-elected as President of Nicaragua in 2006 and took office again on January 10, 2007.

=== El Salvador ===
CIA personnel were also involved in the Salvadoran civil war. Some allege that the techniques used to interrogate prisoners in El Salvador foreshadowed those later used in Iraq and Afghanistan. In fact, when a similar counter-insurgency program was proposed in Iraq, it was referred to as "the Salvador Option". Agency officers had strict instructions not to participate in interrogations of prisoners, and to avoid the area where prisoners were held.

=== Somalia ===
Location of Somalia

CIA sent in teams of Paramilitary Operations Officers into Somalia prior to the U.S. intervention in 1992. On December 23, 1992, Paramilitary Operations Officer Larry Freedman became the first casualty of the conflict in Somalia. Freedman was a former Army Delta Force operator who had served in every conflict that the U.S. was involved in, both officially and unofficially, since Vietnam. Freedman was killed while conducting special reconnaissance in advance of the entry of U.S. military forces. His mission was completely voluntary, but it required entry into a very hostile area without any support. Freedman was posthumously awarded the Intelligence Star on January 5, 1993, for his "extraordinary heroism."

SAD/SOG teams were key in working with JSOC and tracking high-value targets (HVT), known as "Tier One Personalities". Their efforts, working under extremely dangerous conditions with little to no support, led to several very successful joint JSOC/CIA operations. In one specific operation, a CIA case officer, Michael Shanklin and codenamed "Condor", working with a CIA Technical Operations Officer from the Directorate of Science and Technology, managed to get a cane with a beacon in it to Osman Ato, a wealthy businessman, arms importer, and Mohammed Aideed, a money man whose name was right below Mohamed Farrah Aidid's on the Tier One list.

Once Condor confirmed that Ato was in a vehicle, JSOC's Delta Force launched a capture operation.

a Little Bird helicopter dropped out of the sky, and a sniper leaned out and fired three shots into the car's engine block. The car ground to a halt as commandos roped down from hovering Blackhawks [sic], surrounded the car, and handcuffed Ato. It was the first known helicopter takedown of suspects in a moving car. The next time Jones saw the magic cane, an hour later, Garrison had it in his hand. "I like this cane," Jones remembers the general exclaiming, a big grin on his face. "Let's use this again." Finally, a tier-one personality was in custody.

President Bill Clinton withdrew U.S. forces on May 4, 1994.

In June 2006, the Islamic Courts Union seized control of southern Somalia, including the country's capital Mogadishu, prompting the Ethiopian government to send in troops to try to protect the transitional government. In December, the Islamic Courts warned Ethiopia they would declare war if Ethiopia did not remove all its troops from Somalia. Sheikh Sharif Ahmed, leader of the Islamic Courts, called for a jihad, or holy war, against Ethiopia and encouraged foreign Muslim fighters to come to Somalia. At that time, the United States accused the group of being controlled by al-Qaeda, but the Islamic Courts denied that charge.

In 2009, PBS reported that al-Qaeda had been training terrorists in Somalia for years. Until December 2006, Somalia's government had no power outside of the town of Baidoa, 150 miles (240 km) from the capital. The countryside and the capital were run by warlords and militia groups who could be paid to protect terrorist groups.

CIA officers kept close tabs on the country and paid a group of Somali warlords to help hunt down members of al-Qaeda according to The New York Times. Meanwhile, Ayman al-Zawahiri, the deputy to al-Qaeda leader Osama bin Laden, issued a message calling for all Muslims to go to Somalia. On January 9, 2007, a U.S. official said that ten militants were killed in one airstrike.

On September 14, 2009, Saleh Ali Saleh Nabhan, a senior al-Qaeda leader in East Africa as well as a senior leader in Shabaab, al Qaeda's surrogate in Somalia, was killed by elements of U.S. Special Operations. According to a witness, at least two AH-6 Little Bird attack helicopters strafed a two-car convoy. Navy SEALs then seized the body of Nabhan and took two other wounded fighters captive. JSOC and the CIA had been trying to kill Nabhan for some time including back in January 2007, when an AC-130 Gunship was called in on one attempt. A U.S. intelligence source stated that CIA paramilitary teams are directly embedded with Ethiopian forces in Somalia, allowing for the tactical intelligence to launch these operations. Nabhan was wanted for his involvement in the 1998 United States embassy bombings, as well as leading the cell behind the 2002 Mombasa attacks. Nabhan's remains were given a burial at sea following the operation. On September 11, 2020, Admiral William McRaven revealed in an interview with the Michael Hayden Center that the decision to use burial at sea for the disposition of Osama Bin Laden's body following Operation Neptune Spear was a direct result of his experiences in the killing of Nabhan, citing a belief that the chances of operational success were greater if decisions and procedures were made "as routine as possible."

From 2010 to 2013, the CIA set up the Somalia National Intelligence and Security Agency (NISA) by providing training, funding, and diplomatic access. In the same time period, the EU and UN have spent millions of dollars on the military training of the Somali National Army (SNA). NISA is considered a professional Somali security force that can be relied upon to neutralize the terrorist threat. This force responded to the complex al-Shabaab attack on the Banadir Regional Courthouse in Mogadishu that killed 25 civilians. NISA's response, however, saved hundreds of people and resulted in the death of all the al-Shabaab guerrillas involved.

Significant events during this time frame included the targeted drone strikes against British al-Qaida operative Bilal el-Berjawi and Moroccan al-Qaida operative Abu Ibrahim. It also included the rescue of U.S. citizen Jessica Buchanan by U.S. Navy SEALs. All likely aided by intelligence collection efforts in Somalia.

In November 2020, Michael Goodboe, a senior CIA paramilitary officer, was killed in a terrorist attack in Mogadishu, Somalia. Goodboe was a member of SEAL Team 6 prior to serving with the Special Activities Center. He is the most recent star added to the memorial wall at CIA headquarters in Langley, Virginia. At the time of the attack, the U.S. had around 700 troops in Somalia, assisting local forces to defeat al-Shabaab, the burgeoning al-Qaeda-affiliated terrorist group with an estimated 9,000 fighters throughout the region. The terrorist organization has vowed to overthrow the Somali government, which is supported by some 20,000 troops from the African Union.

=== Afghanistan ===
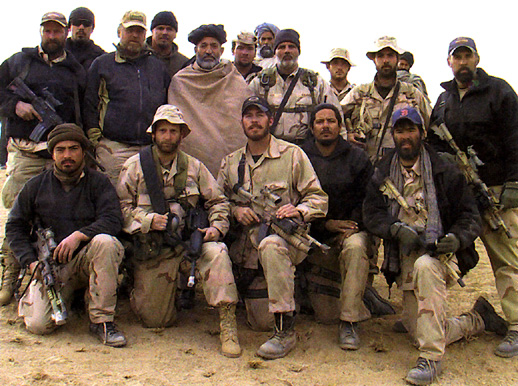
Hamid Karzai with Special Forces and CIA Paramilitary in late 2001

During the Soviet–Afghan War in the 1980s, Paramilitary Operations Officers were instrumental in equipping Mujaheddin forces against the Soviet Army. Although the CIA in general, and a Texas congressman named Charlie Wilson in particular, have received most of the attention, the key architect of this strategy was Michael G. Vickers. Vickers was a young Paramilitary Operations Officer from SAD/SOG. The CIA's efforts have been given credit for assisting in ending the Soviet involvement in Afghanistan.

SAD paramilitary teams were active in Afghanistan in the 1990s in clandestine operations to locate and kill or capture Osama bin Laden. These teams planned several operations but did not receive the order to execute from President Bill Clinton because the available intelligence did not guarantee a successful outcome weighed against the extraordinary risk to the SAD/SOG teams that would execute the mission. These efforts did, however, build many of the relationships that would prove essential in 2001 U.S. Invasion of Afghanistan.

On September 26, 2001, a CIA team code-named "Jawbreaker" led by Gary Schroen, a case officer, with several members from Special Activities Division including Schroen's deputy Philip Reilly, a paramilitary officer, were the first U.S. forces inserted into Afghanistan. The team entered Uzbekistan nine days after the 9/11 attack and linked up with the Northern Alliance in its safe haven of the Panjshir Valley as part of Task Force Dagger.

On October 17, 2001, the eight members of the CIA's Team Alpha were inserted into the Darya Suf Valley in two Black Hawk helicopters. Four members of Team Alpha were paramilitary officers from SAD: Alex Hernandez, Scott Spellmeyer, Johnny Micheal Spann, and Andy Hartsog. A fifth, Mark Rausenberger, later became a paramilitary officer; he died on CIA duty in the Philippines in 2016.

The CIA teams provided the Northern Alliance with resources including millions of dollars in cash to buy weapons and pay local fighters and prepared for the arrival of USSOCOM forces. The plan for the invasion of Afghanistan was developed by the CIA, the first time in United States history that such a large-scale military operation was planned by the CIA. SAD, U.S. Army Special Forces, and the Northern Alliance combined to overthrow the Taliban in Afghanistan with minimal loss of U.S. lives. They did this without the use of conventional U.S. military ground forces.

The Washington Post stated in an editorial by John Lehman in 2006:

What made the Afghan campaign a landmark in the U.S. Military's history is that it was prosecuted by Special Operations forces from all the services, along with Navy and Air Force tactical power, operations by the Afghan Northern Alliance and the CIA were equally important and fully integrated. No large Army or Marine force was employed.

In a 2008 New York Times book review of Horse Soldiers, a book by Doug Stanton about the invasion of Afghanistan, Bruce Barcott wrote:

The valor exhibited by Afghan and American soldiers, fighting to free Afghanistan from a horribly cruel regime, will inspire even the most jaded reader. The stunning victory of the horse soldiers – 350 Special Forces soldiers, 100 C.I.A. officers, and 15,000 Northern Alliance fighters routing a Taliban army 50,000 strong – deserves a hallowed place in American military history.

Small and highly agile paramilitary mobile teams spread out over the countryside to meet with locals and gather information about the Taliban and al-Qa'ida. During that time, one of the teams was approached in a village and asked by a young man for help in retrieving his teenage sister. He explained that a senior Taliban official had taken her as a wife and had sharply restricted the time she could spend with her family. The team gave the man a small hand-held tracking device to pass along to his sister, with instructions for her to activate it when the Taliban leader returned home. As a result, the team captured the senior Taliban official and rescued the sister.

==== Tora Bora ====
In December 2001, Special Activities Division and the Army's Delta Force tracked down Osama bin Laden in the rugged mountains near the Khyber Pass in Afghanistan. Former CIA station chief Gary Berntsen, as well as a subsequent Senate investigation, said that the combined American special operations task force was largely outnumbered by al-Qaeda forces and that they were denied additional U.S. troops by higher command. The task force also requested munitions to block the avenues of egress of bin Laden, but that request was also denied. The SAC team was unsuccessful, and "Bin Laden and bodyguards walked uncontested out of Tora Bora and disappeared into Pakistan's unregulated tribal area." At Bin Laden's abandoned encampment, the team uncovered evidence that bin Laden's ultimate aim was to obtain and detonate a nuclear device in the United States.

==== Surge ====
In September 2009, the CIA planned on "deploying teams of spies, analysts and paramilitary operatives to Afghanistan, part of a broad intelligence 'surge' ordered by President Obama. This will make its station there among the largest in the agency's history." This presence was expected to surpass the size of the stations in Iraq and Vietnam at the height of those wars. The station was located at the U.S. Embassy in Kabul and was led "by a veteran with an extensive background in paramilitary operations". The majority of the CIA's workforce was located among secret bases and military special operations posts throughout the country.

Also, in 2009, General Stanley McChrystal, the commander of NATO forces in Afghanistan, planned to request an increase in teams of CIA operatives, including their elite paramilitary officers, to join with U.S. military special operations forces. This combination worked well in Iraq and was largely credited with the success of that surge. There were basically three options described in the media: McChrystal's increased counterinsurgency campaign; a counter-terror campaign using special operations raids and drone strikes; and withdrawal. The most successful combination in both the wars in Afghanistan and Iraq was the linking up of SAD and military special forces to fight alongside highly trained indigenous units. One thing all of these options had in common was a requirement for greater CIA participation.

==== The End Game ====
According to existing and former intelligence officials, General McChrystal had his own preferred candidate for the Chief of Station (COS) job, a good friend and decorated CIA paramilitary officer. The officer had extensive experience in war zones, including two previous tours in Afghanistan with one as the Chief of Station, as well as tours in the Balkans, Baghdad and Yemen. He was well known in CIA lore as "the man who saved Hamid Karzai's life when the CIA led the effort to oust the Taliban from power in 2001". President Karzai was said to be greatly indebted to this officer and was pleased when the officer was named chief of station again. According to interviews with several senior officials, this officer "was uniformly well-liked and admired. A career paramilitary officer, he came to the CIA after several years in an elite Marine unit".

General McChrystal's strategy included the lash up of special operations forces from the U.S. Military and from SAC/SOG to duplicate the initial success and the defeat of the Taliban in 2001 and the success of the "Surge" in Iraq in 2007. This strategy proved highly successful and worked very well in Afghanistan with SAC/SOG and JSOC forces conducting raids nearly every night having "superb results" against the enemy.

In 2001, the CIA's SAD/SOG began creating what would come to be called Counter-terrorism Pursuit Teams (CTPT). These units grew to include over 3,000 operatives by 2010 and were involved in sustained heavy fighting against the enemy. It was considered the "best Afghan fighting force."

Located at 7,800 feet (2,400 m) above sea level, Firebase Lilley in Shkin served as a "nerve center for the covert war." This covert war included being a hub for these CTPT operations, with Firebase Lilley being just one in a constellation of CIA bases across Afghanistan. These units were not only highly effective in combat operations against the Taliban and al-Qaeda forces but were also used to engage with the tribes in areas with no other official government presence.

This covert war also included a large SOG/CTPT expansion into Pakistan to target senior al-Qaeda and Taliban leadership in the Federally Administered Tribal Area (FATA). CTPT units are the main effort in both the "Counter-terrorism plus" and the full "Counterinsurgency" options being discussed by the Obama administration in the December 2010 review. SOG/CTPT are also key to any exit strategy for the U.S. government to leave Afghanistan, while still being able to deny al-Qaeda and other trans-national extremists groups a safe haven both in Afghanistan and in the FATA of Pakistan.

In January 2013, a CIA drone strike killed Mullah Nazir, a senior Taliban commander in the South Waziristan area of Pakistan believed responsible for carrying out the insurgent effort against the U.S. military in Afghanistan. Nazir's death degraded the Taliban.

The U.S. decided to lean heavily on CIA in general, and SAC specifically in their efforts to withdraw from Afghanistan as it did in Iraq. There are plans being considered to have several U.S. Military special operations elements assigned to CIA after the withdrawal. If so, there would still be a chance to rebuild and assist and coordinate (with Afghan ANSF commandos) and continue to keep a small footprint while allowing free elections and pushing back the Taliban/AQ forces that have failed but continue to attempt their taking back parts of the country, as they have had between 2015 through 2016.

The Trump administration doubled down on the covert war in Afghanistan by increasing the number of paramilitary officers from SAD fighting alongside and leading the Afghan CTPT's, supported by Omega Teams from JSOC. Combined they are considered the most effective units in Afghanistan and the linchpin of the counter insurgency and counter-terrorism effort. The war has been largely turned over to SAC. On October 21, 2016, two senior paramilitary officers, Brian Hoke and Nate Delemarre, were killed during a CTPT operation in Jalalabad, Afghanistan. The two longtime friends were killed fighting side-by-side against the Taliban and buried next to each other at Arlington National Cemetery.

The New York Times reported in March 2020 that during the Trump administration's negotiations with the Taliban on the peace agreement, several advocated for an increase in CIA paramilitary capability as the U.S. Military reduced its capability to compensate for that reduction. The shift to a bigger role by the CIA was adamantly opposed by the Taliban, who threatened to withdraw from the talks. As a result, the idea was shelved. Many existing and former officials believed finding a way for the CIA and its paramilitary forces to continue to work with a new Afghan government was critical to the long-term survival of the deal and the counter-terrorism efforts in the region.

=== Yemen ===
On November 5, 2002, a missile launched from a CIA-controlled Predator drone killed al-Qaeda members traveling in a remote area in Yemen. SAD/SOG paramilitary teams had been on the ground tracking their movements for months and called in this air strike. One of those in the car was Ali Qaed Senyan al-Harthi, al-Qaeda's chief operative in Yemen and a suspect in the October 2000 bombing of the destroyer USS Cole. Five other people, believed to be low-level al-Qaeda members, were also killed including an American named Kamal Derwish. Former Deputy U.S. Defense Secretary Paul Wolfowitz called it "a very successful tactical operation" and said "such strikes are useful not only in killing terrorists but in forcing al-Qaeda to change its tactics".

"It's an important step that has been taken in that it has eliminated another level of experienced leadership from al-Qaeda," said Vince Cannistraro, former head of counter-terrorism for the CIA and current ABC News consultant. "It will help weaken the organization and make it much less effective." Harithi was on the run, pursued by several security forces who were looking for him and Muhammad Hamdi al-Ahdal, another suspect in the USS Cole bombing case.

In 2009, the Obama administration authorized continued lethal operations in Yemen by the CIA. As a result, the SAD/SOG and JSOC joined together to aggressively target al-Qaeda operatives in that country, both through leading Yemenese special forces and intelligence-driven drone strikes. A major target of these operations was Imam Anwar al-Awlaki, an American citizen with ties to both Nidal Hasan, the convicted Fort Hood attacker, and Umar Farouk Abdulmutallab, the Christmas 2009 attempted bomber of Northwest Airline flight 253. Imam al-Awlaki was killed on September 30, 2011, by an air attack carried out by the Joint Special Operations Command.

On January 31, 2020, The New York Times reported that three U.S. officials "expressed confidence" that Qasim al-Raymi, the emir of AQAP was killed by the CIA on January 25, in Al Abdiyah District, Ma'rib Governorate, Yemen. For more than five years, al-Raymi eluded U.S. forces as he led what experts referred to as al-Qaida's "most dangerous franchise." Former Deputy Assistant Secretary of Defense Mick Mulroy said, if confirmed, his death would be "very significant." Al-Raymi was the target of the January 29, 2017, special operations raid in which Navy SEAL Ryan Owens was killed. "The U.S. never forgets," Mulroy said. The Wall Street Journal also reported al-Raymi attempted to blow up a U.S.-bound airliner on Christmas Day 2009. U.S. President Donald Trump appeared to confirm reports that the U.S. had killed al-Raymi, by retweeting reports claiming that the CIA had conducted the strike. Experts considered him a possible successor to Ayman al-Zawahiri, the leader of al-Qaeda overall.

=== Iraq ===
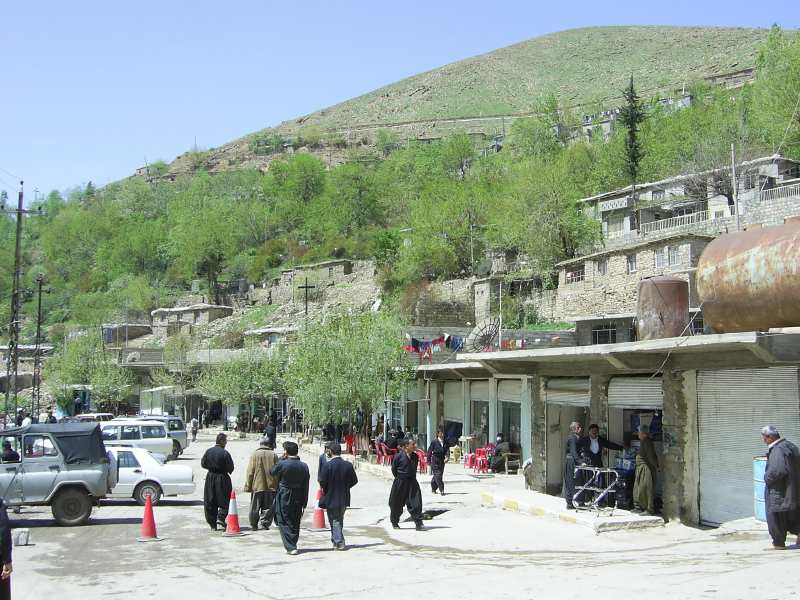
The village of Biyara and Base of Ansar al-Islam 2001–2003

SAD paramilitary teams entered Northern Iraq before the 2003 invasion. Once on the ground, they prepared the battlespace for the subsequent arrival of U.S. military forces. SAD teams then combined with U.S. Army special forces (on a team called the Northern Iraq Liaison Element or NILE). This team organized the Kurdish Peshmerga for the subsequent U.S.-led invasion. This joint team combined in Operation Viking Hammer to defeat Ansar al-Islam, an Islamist group allied to al-Qaeda, which several battle-hardened fighters from Afghanistan had joined after the fall of the Taliban, in a battle for control over the northeast of Iraq—a battle that turned out being one of the "most intense battles of Special Forces since Vietnam." This battle was for an entire territory that was completely occupied by Ansar al-Islam and was executed prior to the invasion in February 2003. If this battle had not been as successful as it was, there would have been a considerable hostile force in the rear of the U.S./secular Kurdish force in the subsequent assault on the Iraqi Army to the south. The U.S. side was represented by paramilitary operations officers from SAD/SOG and the Army's 10th Special Forces Group (10th SFG). 10th SFG soldiers were awarded three Silver Stars and six Bronze Stars with V for valor for this battle alone and several paramilitary officers were awarded the Intelligence Star for valor in combat. This battle was a significant direct attack and victory on a key U.S. opponent. It resulted in the deaths of a substantial number of militants and the uncovering of a crude laboratory that had traces of poisons and information on chemical weapons at Sargat. The team found foreign identity cards, visas, and passports on the enemy bodies. They had come from a wide variety of Middle Eastern and North African countries, including Yemen, Sudan, Saudi Arabia, Qatar, Oman, Tunisia, Morocco, and Iran. Sargat was also the only facility that had traces of chemical weapons discovered in the Iraq war.

In a 2004 U.S. News & World Report article, "A firefight in the mountains," the author states:

Viking Hammer would go down in the annals of Special Forces history – a battle fought on foot, under sustained fire from an enemy lodged in the mountains, and with minimal artillery and air support.

SAD/SOG teams also conducted high-risk special reconnaissance missions behind Iraqi lines to identify senior leadership targets. These missions led to the initial assassination attempts against Iraqi President Saddam Hussein and his key generals. Although the initial air strike against Hussein was unsuccessful in killing the dictator, it was successful in effectively ending his ability to command and control his forces. Other strikes against key generals were successful and significantly degraded the command's ability to react to and maneuver against the U.S.-led invasion force. SAD operations officers were also successful in convincing key Iraqi Army officers to surrender their units once the fighting started and/or not to oppose the invasion force.

NATO member Turkey refused to allow its territory to be used by the U.S. Army's 4th Infantry Division for the invasion. As a result, the SAD/SOG, U.S. Army special forces joint teams, the Kurdish Peshmerga, and the 173d Airborne Brigade were the entire northern force against the Iraqi Army during the invasion. Their efforts kept the 13 divisions of the Iraqi Army in place to defend against the Kurds rather than allowing them to contest the coalition force coming from the south. This combined U.S. special operations and Kurdish force defeated the Iraqi Army. Four members of the SAD/SOG team received CIA's rare Intelligence Star for "extraordinary heroism".

The mission that captured Saddam Hussein was called "Operation Red Dawn." It was planned and carried out by JSOC's Delta Force and SAD/SOG teams (together called Task Force 121). The operation eventually included around 600 soldiers from the 1st Brigade of the 4th Infantry Division. Special operations troops probably numbered around 40. Much of the publicity and credit for the capture went to the 4th Infantry Division soldiers, but CIA and JSOC were the driving force. "Task Force 121 were actually the ones who pulled Saddam out of the hole" said Robert Andrews, former deputy assistant Secretary of Defense for special operations and low-intensity conflict. "They can't be denied a role anymore."

CIA paramilitary teams continued to assist JSOC in Iraq, and in 2007, the combination created a lethal force many credit with having a major impact in the success of "the Surge". They did this by killing or capturing many of the key al-Qaeda leaders in Iraq. In a CBS 60 Minutes interview, Pulitzer Prize-winning journalist Bob Woodward described a new special operations capability that allowed for this success. This capability was developed by the joint teams of CIA and JSOC. Several senior U.S. officials stated that the "joint efforts of JSOC and CIA paramilitary units was the most significant contributor to the defeat of al-Qaeda in Iraq".

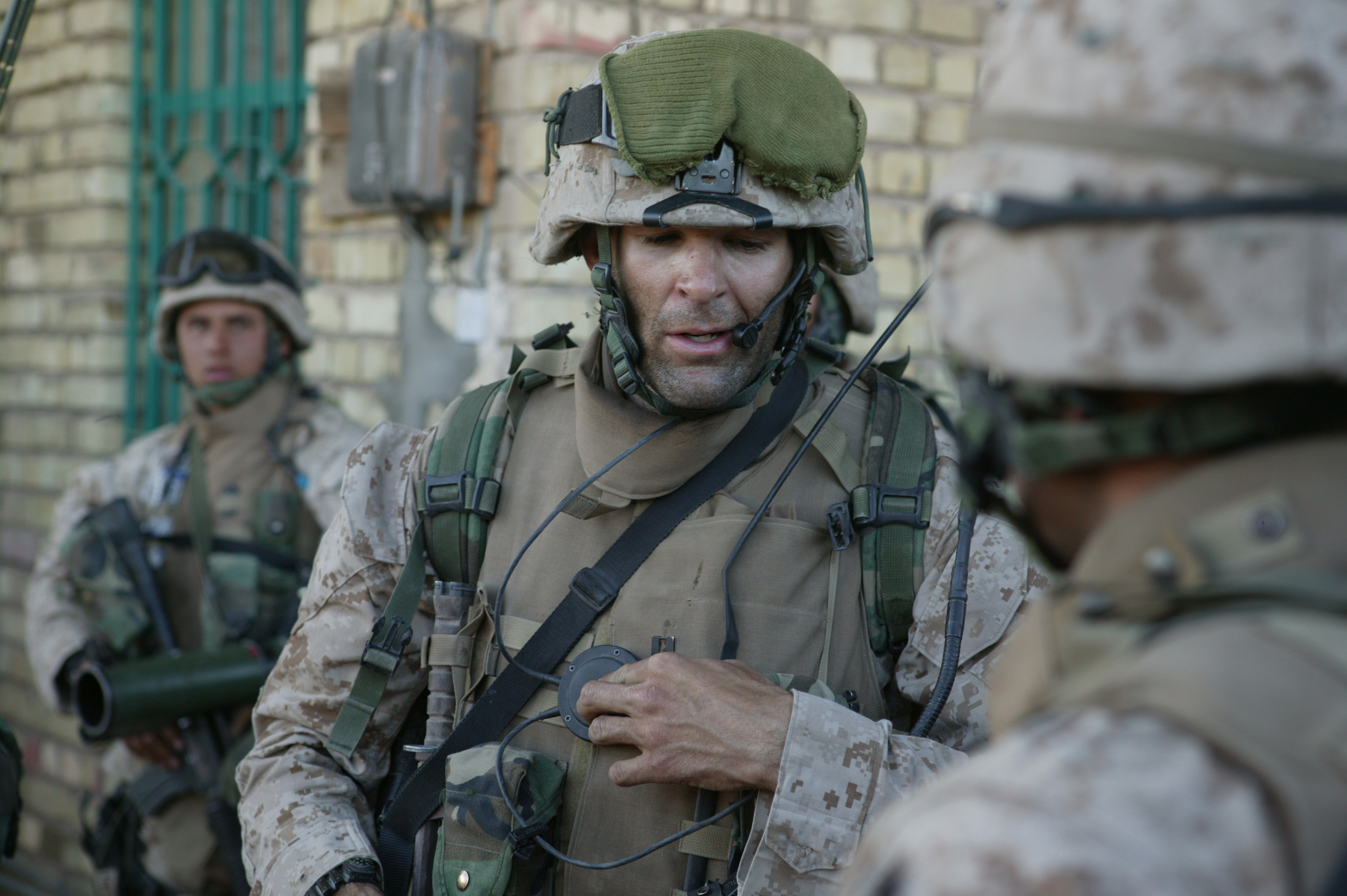
Douglas A. Zembiec, also known as the "Lion of Fallujah"

In May 2007, Marine Major Douglas A. Zembiec was serving in SAD/SOG Ground Branch in Iraq when he was killed by small arms fire while leading a raid with Iraq Special Forces. Reports from fellow paramilitary officers stated that the flash radio report sent was "five wounded and one martyred". Major Zembiec was killed while trying to protect his soldiers, who were members of the Iraqi Army. He was honored with an Intelligence Star for his valor in combat.

On October 26, 2008, SAD/SOG and JSOC conducted an operation in Syria targeting the "foreign fighter logistics network" bringing al-Qaeda operatives into Iraq (See 2008 Abu Kamal raid). A U.S. source told CBS News that "the leader of the foreign fighters, an al-Qaeda officer, was the target of Sunday's cross-border raid." He said the attack was successful, but did not say whether the al-Qaeda officer was killed. Fox News later reported that Abu Ghadiya, "al-Qa'ida's senior coordinator operating in Syria", was killed in the attack. The New York Times reported that, during the raid, U.S. forces killed several armed males who "posed a threat".

In September 2014, with the rise of the Islamic State, the U.S. government began aggressive military operations against them in both Iraq and Syria. SAD Ground Branch was placed in charge of the ground war. This is a testament to SAD of their long-standing relationship with the most effective fighting force in the region, the Kurdish Peshmerga.

=== Pakistan ===
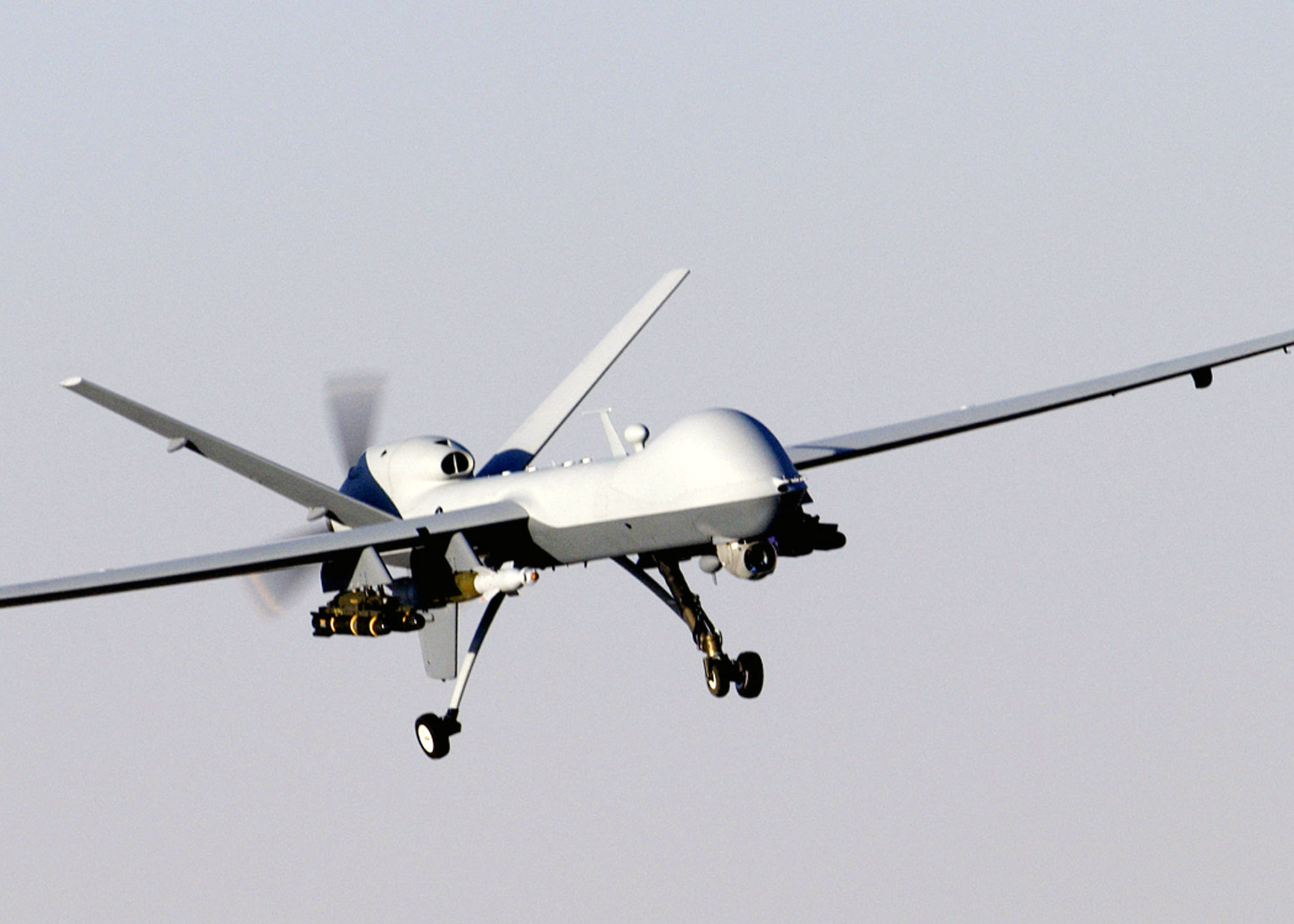
MQ-9 Reaper

SAD/SOG has been very active "on the ground" inside Pakistan targeting al-Qaeda operatives for Unmanned Aerial Vehicle (UAV) Predator strikes and along with USSOCOM elements they have been training Pakistani paramilitary troops and regular Army troops, they have also done HVT target missions alongside Pakistani special forces. Before leaving office, President George W. Bush authorized SAD's successful killing of eight senior al-Qaeda operatives via targeted air strikes. Among those killed were the mastermind of a 2006 plot to detonate explosives aboard planes flying across the Atlantic Rashid Rauf and the man thought to have planned the Islamabad Marriott Hotel bombing on September 20, 2008, that killed 53 people. The CIA Director authorized the continuation of these operations and on January 23, SAD/SOG performed killings of 20 individuals in northwestern Pakistan that were terrorists. Some experts assess that the CIA Director – at that time Leon Panetta – has been more aggressive in conducting paramilitary operations in Pakistan than his predecessor. A Pakistani security official stated that other strikes killed at least 10 insurgents, including five foreign nationals and possibly "a high-value target" such as a senior al-Qaeda or Taliban official. On February 14, the CIA drone killed 27 taliban and al-Qaeda fighters in a missile strike in south Waziristan, a militant stronghold near the Afghan border where al-Qaeda leaders Osama bin Laden and Ayman al-Zawahri were believed to be hiding.

According to the documentary film Drone, by Tonje Schei, since 2002 the U.S. Air Force 17th Reconnaissance Squadron has been working for the CIA as "customer", carrying out at least some of the armed missions in Pakistan.

In a National Public Radio (NPR) report dated February 3, 2008, a senior official stated that al-Qaeda has been "decimated" by SAD/SOG's air and ground operations. This senior U.S. counter-terrorism official goes on to say, "The enemy is really, really struggling. These attacks have produced the broadest, deepest, and most rapid reduction in al-Qaida senior leadership that we've seen in several years." President Obama's CIA Director Leon Panetta stated that SAD/SOG's efforts in Pakistan have been "the most effective weapon" against senior al-Qaeda leadership.

These covert attacks have increased significantly under President Obama, with as many at 50 al-Qaeda militants being killed in the month of May 2009 alone. In June 2009, sixty Taliban fighters were killed while at a funeral to bury fighters that had been killed in previous CIA attacks. On July 22, 2009, National Public Radio reported that U.S. officials believe Saad bin Laden, a son of Osama bin Laden, was killed by a CIA strike in Pakistan. Saad bin Laden spent years under house arrest in Iran before traveling last year to Pakistan, according to former National Intelligence Director Mike McConnell. It's believed he was killed sometime in 2009. A senior U.S. counter-terrorism said U.S. intelligence agencies are "80 to 85 percent" certain that Saad bin Laden is dead.

On August 6, 2009, the CIA announced that Baitullah Mehsud was killed by a SAD/SOG drone strike in Pakistan. The New York Times said, "Although President Obama has distanced himself from many of the Bush administration's counter-terrorism policies, he has embraced and even expanded the C.I.A.'s covert campaign in Pakistan using Predator and Reaper drones." The biggest loss may be to "Osama bin Laden's al-Qa'ida." For the past eight years, al-Qaeda had depended on Mehsud for protection after Mullah Mohammed Omar fled Afghanistan in late 2001. "Mehsud's death means the tent sheltering Al Qaeda has collapsed," an Afghan Taliban intelligence officer who had met Mehsud many times told Newsweek. "Without a doubt he was Al Qaeda's No. 1 guy in Pakistan," adds Mahmood Shah, a retired Pakistani Army brigadier and a former chief of the Federally Administered Tribal Area, or FATA, Mehsud's base.

Airstrikes from CIA drones struck targets in the Federally Administered Tribal Areas (FATA) of Pakistan on September 8, 2009. Reports stated that seven to ten militants were killed to include one top al-Qaida leader. He was Mustafa al-Jaziri, an Algerian national described as an "important and effective" leader and senior military commander for al-Qaida. The success of these operations is believed to have caused senior Taliban leaders to significantly alter their operations and cancel key planning meetings.

The CIA also increased its campaign using Predator missile strikes on al-Qaeda in Pakistan. The number of strikes in 2009 exceeded the 2008 total, according to data compiled by the Long War Journal, which tracks strikes in Pakistan. In December 2009, The New York Times reported that President Obama ordered an expansion of the drone program with senior officials describing the program as "a resounding success, eliminating key terrorists and throwing their operations into disarray". The article also cites a Pakistani official who stated that about 80 missile attacks in less than two years have killed "more than 400" enemy fighters, a number lower than most estimates but in the same range. His account of collateral damage was strikingly lower than many unofficial counts: "We believe the number of civilian casualties is just over 20, and those were people who were either at the side of major terrorists or were at facilities used by terrorists."

On December 6, 2009, a senior al-Qaeda operative, Saleh al-Somali, was killed in a drone strike in Pakistan. He was responsible for their operations outside of the Afghanistan-Pakistan region and formed part of the senior leadership. Al-Somali was engaged in plotting terrorist acts around the world and "given his central role, this probably included plotting attacks against the United States and Europe". On December 31, 2009, senior Taliban leader and strong Haqqani ally Haji Omar Khan, brother of Arif Khan, was killed in the strike along with the son of local tribal leader Karim Khan.

In January 2010, al-Qaeda in Pakistan announced that Lashkar al-Zil leader Abdullah Said al Libi was killed in a drone missile strike. Neither al-Qaeda nor the U.S. has revealed the date of the attack that killed Libi. On January 14, 2010, subsequent to the suicide attack at Camp Chapman, the CIA located and killed the senior Taliban leader in Pakistan, Hakimullah Mehsud. Mehsud had claimed responsibility in a video he made with the suicide bomber Humam Khalil Abu-Mulal al-Balawi.

On February 5, 2010, the Pakistani Inter-Services Intelligence (ISI) and CIA's SAD/SOG conducted a joint raid and apprehended Mullah Abdul Ghani Baradar. Baradar was the most significant Taliban figure to be detained since the beginning of the Afghan War more than eight years ago until that date. He ranked second to Mullah Muhammad Omar, the Taliban's founder and was known to be a close associate of Osama bin Laden. Mullah Baradar was interrogated by CIA and ISI officers for several days before news of his capture was released. This capture sent the message that the Taliban leadership is not safe in Afghanistan or Pakistan. "The seizure of the Afghan Taliban's top military leader in Pakistan represents a turning point in the U.S.-led war against the militants", U.S. officials and analysts said. Per Pakistani Interior Minister Rehman Malik, several raids in Karachi in early February netted dozens of suspected Afghan militants. In other joint raids that occurred around the same time, Afghan officials said that the Taliban "shadow governors" for two provinces in northern Afghanistan had also been detained. Mullah Abdul Salam, the Taliban's leader in Kunduz, and Mullah Mir Mohammed of Baghlan were captured in Akora Khattack.

On February 20, Muhammad Haqqani, son of Jalaluddin Haqqani, was one of four people killed in the drone strike in Pakistan's tribal region in North Waziristan, according to two Pakistani intelligence sources.

On May 31, 2010, The New York Times reported that Mustafa Abu al Yazid (AKA Saeed al Masri), a senior operational leader for Al Qaeda, was killed in an American missile strike in Pakistan's tribal areas.

From July to December 2010, predator strikes killed 535 suspected militants in the FATA to include Sheikh Fateh Al Misri, Al-Qaeda's new third in command on September 25. Al Misri was planning a major terrorist attack in Europe by recruiting British Muslims who would then go on a shooting rampage similar to what transpired in Mumbai in November 2008.

==== Operation Neptune Spear ====
President Barack Obama's address (text)

On May 1, 2011, President Barack Obama announced that Osama bin Laden had been killed earlier that day in Abbottabad by "a small team of Americans" acting under his direct orders during a CIA operation under Director Leon Panetta. The helicopter raid was executed from a CIA forward operating base in Afghanistan by the elements of the U.S. Naval Special Warfare Development Group (assigned to the CIA) and CIA paramilitary operatives.

The operation in the Bilal military cantonment area in Abbottabad resulted in the acquisition of extensive intelligence on the future attack plans of al-Qaeda. Bin Laden's body was flown to Afghanistan to be identified and then forwarded to the aircraft carrier USS Carl Vinson for a burial at sea. Results from the DNA samples taken in Afghanistan were compared with those of a known relative of bin Laden's and confirmed the identity.

The operation was a result of years of intelligence work that included the Inter-Services Intelligence (ISI), the CIA, the DSS, and the Delta Force's apprehension and interrogation of Khalid Sheikh Mohammad (KSM), the discovery of the real name of the courier disclosed by KSM, the tracking, via signal intelligence, of the courier to the Abbottobad compound by paramilitary operatives and the establishment of a CIA safe house that provided critical advance intelligence for the operation.

The material discovered in the raid indicated that bin Laden was still in charge of Al-Qaeda and was developing plans and issuing orders at the time of his death. There is considerable controversy over claims that elements of the Pakistani government, particularly the ISI, may have been concealing the presence of Osama bin Laden in Pakistan. Bin Laden's death has been labeled a "game changer" and a fatal blow to Al-Qaeda, by senior U.S. officials.

=== Iran ===
In the early 1950s, the Central Intelligence Agency and Britain's Secret Intelligence Service were ordered to overthrow the democratically-elected government of Iran, Prime Minister Mohammed Mosaddeq, and re-install deposed Shah Mohammad Reza Pahlavi. This event was called Operation Ajax. The senior CIA officer was Kermit Roosevelt, Jr., the grandson of American president Theodore Roosevelt. The operation utilized all of SAC's components to include political action, covert influence, and paramilitary operations. The paramilitary component included training anti-Communist guerrillas to fight the Tudeh Party if they seized power in the chaos of Operation Ajax. Although a significant tactical/operational success, Operation Ajax is considered very controversial with many critics.

In November 1979, a group of Islamist students and militants took over the American embassy in support of the Iranian Revolution. Operation Eagle Claw was the unsuccessful United States military operation that attempted to rescue the 52 hostages from the U.S. Embassy in Tehran, Iran on April 24, 1980. Several SAC/SOG teams infiltrated into Tehran to support this operation.

On March 9, 2007, the alleged CIA officer Robert Levinson was kidnapped from Iran's Kish Island. On July 7, 2008, Pulitzer Prize winning investigative journalist and author Seymour Hersh wrote an article in the New Yorker stating that the Bush administration had signed a Presidential Finding authorizing the CIA to begin cross border paramilitary operations from Iraq and Afghanistan into Iran. These operations would be against Quds Force, the commando arm of the Iranian Revolutionary Guard, public and private sector strategic targets, and "high-value targets" in the war on terror. Also enrolled to support CIA objectives were the Mujahideen-e-Khalq, known in the West as the M.E.K., and the Baluchis insurgents. "The Finding was focused on undermining Iran's nuclear ambitions and trying to undermine the government through regime change," a person familiar with its contents said, and involved "working with opposition groups and passing money." Any significant effort against Iran by the Obama administration would likely come directly from SAC. and in July 2010, Director Panetta chose a former chief of SAC as the new NCS Director. Levinson reportedly died in 2020 (or before), while in Iranian custody.

=== Libya ===
After the Arab Spring movements overthrew the rulers of Tunisia and Egypt, its neighbors to the west and east respectively, Libya had a major revolt beginning in February 2011. In response, the Obama administration sent in SAC paramilitary operatives to assess the situation and gather information on the opposition forces. Experts speculated that these teams could have been determining the capability of these forces to defeat the Muammar Gaddafi regime and whether Al-Qaeda had a presence in these rebel elements.

U.S. officials had made it clear that no U.S. troops would be "on the ground", making the use of covert paramilitary operatives the only alternative. During the early phases of the Libyan offensive of U.S.-led air strikes, paramilitary operatives assisted in the recovery of a U.S. Air Force pilot who had crashed due to mechanical problems. There was speculation that President Obama issued a covert action finding in March 2011 that authorized the CIA to carry out a clandestine effort to provide arms and support to the Libyan opposition.

=== Syria ===
The 2008 Abu Kamal raid was a helicopter-borne raid conducted by paramilitary officers from Special Activities Division and United States Special Operations Command, Joint Special Operations Command inside Syrian territory on October 26, 2008. The Syrian government called the event a "criminal and terrorist" attack on its sovereignty, alleging all of the reported eight fatalities were civilians. An unnamed U.S. military source, however, alleges that the target was a network of foreign fighters who planned to travel through Syria to join the Iraqi insurgency against the United States-led Coalition in Iraq and the Iraqi government.

In early September 2013, President Obama told U.S. senators that the CIA had trained the first 50-man insurgent element and that they had been inserted into Syria. The deployment of this unit and the supplying of weapons may be the first tangible measure of support since the U.S. stated they would begin providing assistance to the opposition. In October 2013, SAC was tasked with supporting moderate Syrian rebels to help engineer a stalemate and political settlement in the Syrian civil war. This program was considered too limited to have the desired outcome.

With the rise of the Islamic State, however, SAC was given the overall command and control of the ground fight against them. This fight crossed borders between Iraq and Syria.

Again in 2015, the combination of the U.S. Military's JSOC and the CIA's Special Activities Center became the force of choice for fighting this conflict. SAC stood up and ran a robust covert action program to overthrow the Assad regime. The program was successful, including in 2015 when rebels using tank-destroying missiles routed government forces in northern Syria. But by late 2015, the Russians came to Assad's aid, and their focus was focusing squarely on the C.I.A.-backed fighters battling Syrian government troops. Many of the fighters were killed, and the fortunes of the rebel army reversed. According to the Middle East Institute, the program was never given the level of political support that was necessary for it to succeed – "They never gave it the necessary resources or space to determine the dynamics of the battlefield. They were drip-feeding opposition groups just enough to survive but never enough to become dominant actors."

In December 2018, US President Donald Trump announced that US troops involved in the fight against the Islamic State (ISIS) in northeast Syria would be withdrawn imminently. Trump's surprise decision overturned Washington's policy in the Middle East. It also fueled the ambitions and anxieties of local and regional actors vying over the future shape of Syria. Many experts proposed that President Trump could mitigate the damage of his withdrawal of U.S. military forces from Syria by using SAC. Many believed the president chose "to replace U.S. ground forces in Syria with personnel from the CIA's Special Activities Division and that the process has been underway for months. Already experienced in operations in Syria, the CIA has numerous paramilitary officers who have the skills to operate independently in harm's way. And while the CIA lacks the numbers to replace all 2,000 U.S. military personnel currently in Syria" and work alongside the Syrian Democratic Forces (these CIA personnel are spread across the world), their model is based on fewer enablers and support.

==== Operation Kayla Mueller ====
On October 26, 2019, U.S. Joint Special Operations Command's (JSOC) Delta Force conducted a raid into the Idlib province of Syria on the border with Turkey that resulted in the death of Ibrahim Awad Ibrahim Ali al-Badri al-Samarrai also known as Abū Bakr al-Baghdadi. The raid was launched based on a CIA Special Activities Division's intelligence collection and close target reconnaissance effort that located the leader of ISIS. Launched after midnight local time, the eight helicopters carrying the teams along with support aircraft crossed hundreds of miles of airspace controlled by Iraq, Turkey and Russia. Upon arrival, efforts were made for Baghdadi to surrender, with those efforts unsuccessful. U.S. forces responded by blowing a large hole into the side of the compound. After entering, the compound was cleared, with people either surrendering or being shot and killed. The two-hour raid culminated with Baghdadi fleeing from U.S. forces into a dead-end tunnel and detonating a suicide vest, killing himself and two of his children. The complex operation was conducted during the withdrawal of U.S. forces from northeast Syria, adding to the complexity.

=== United States ===
In 1967, the SAD was involved with the CIA's domestic espionage operation Project MERRIMAC in conjunction with the Office of Security. SAD reported approval of the project to the office and reported that the CIA had assets in the area that could be used to monitor and infiltrate Washington-based anti-war groups that might pose potential threats to the CIA. In addition, the SAD Chief provided reports of findings to the SRS. Many documents related to MERRIMAC were destroyed by the CIA in compliance with a recommendation from the Rockefeller Commission to destroy files, not in compliance with new rules.

== Worldwide mission ==
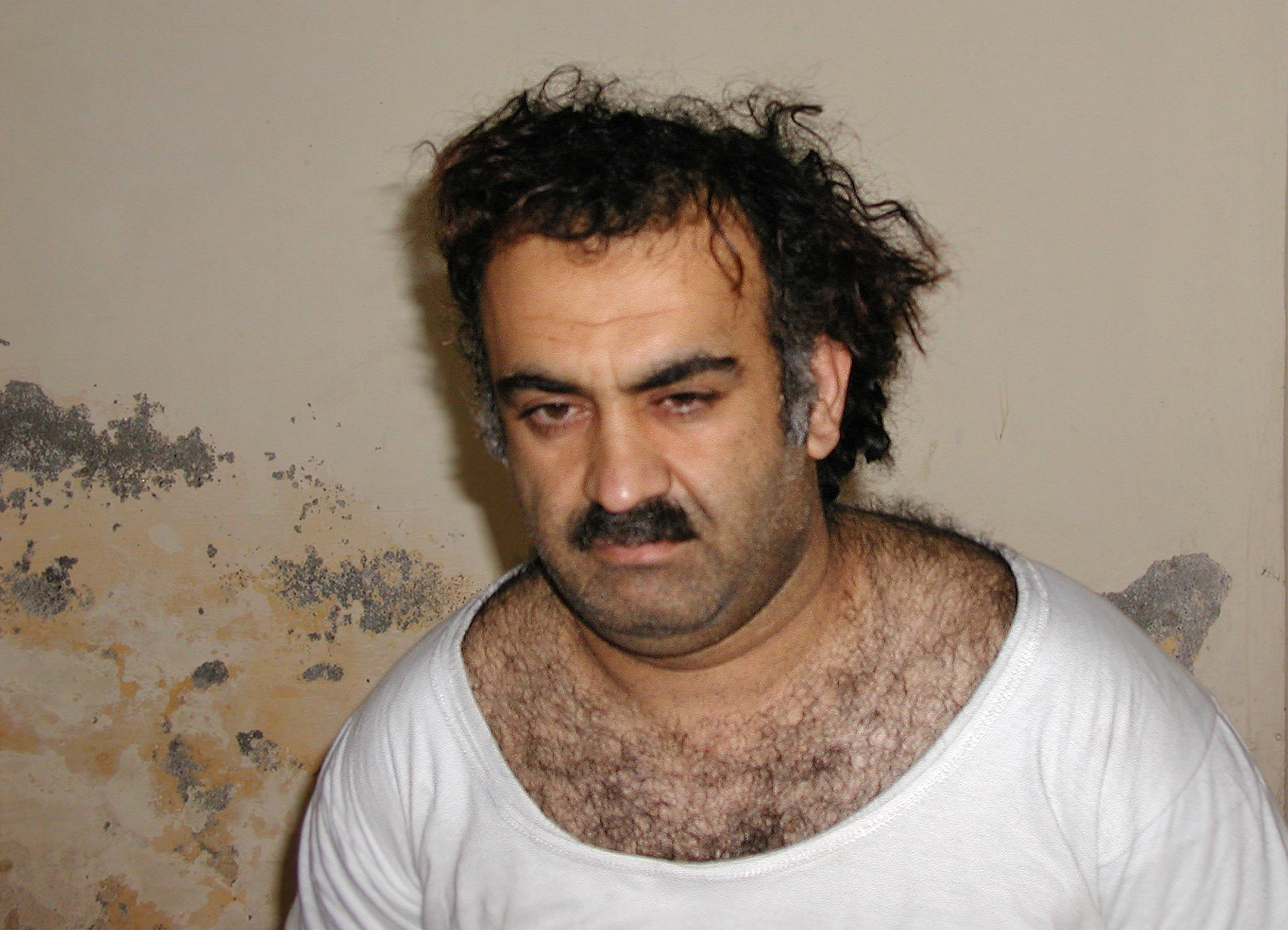
Khalid Shaikh Mohammed after his capture

The CIA has always had a Special Activities Center, which secretly carries out special operations missions. Since September 11, 2001, however, the U.S. government has relied much more on SAC/SOG because fighting terrorists does not usually involve fighting other armies. Rather, it involves secretly moving in and out of countries like Iran, Somalia, etc., where the American military is not legally allowed to operate. If there are missions in these countries that are denied to U.S. military special operations forces, SAC/SOG units are the primary national special missions units to execute those operations.

In the war on terror, SAC has the lead in the covert war being waged against al Qaeda. SAC/SOG paramilitary teams have apprehended many of the senior leaders. These include: Abu Zubaydah, the chief of operations for al-Qaeda; Ramzi bin al-Shibh, the so-called "20th hijacker"; Khalid Sheikh Mohammed, the mastermind of the September 11, 2001 attacks on New York City and Washington, D.C.; Abd al-Rahim al-Nashiri, alleged to be the mastermind of the USS Cole bombing and leader of al Qaeda operations in the Persian Gulf prior to his capture in November 2002; Abu Faraj al-Libi, al Qaeda's "field general" believed to have taken the role of No. 3 in al Qaeda following the capture of Khalid Sheikh Mohammed in Pakistan; and Mullah Abdul Ghani Baradar, the number two Taliban commander and the highest level Taliban commander apprehended in the Afghan War. Prior to the beginning of the "war on terror", SAC/SOG located and captured many notable militants and international criminals, including Abimael Guzmán and Carlos the Jackal. These were just two of the over 50 caught by SAC/SOG just between 1983 and 1995.

In 2002, the George W. Bush administration prepared a list of "terrorist leaders" the CIA is authorized to kill in a targeted killing if capture is impractical and civilian casualties can be kept to an acceptable number. The list included key al-Qaeda leaders like Ayman al-Zawahiri and, formerly, his predecessor Osama bin Laden. The list also includes principal leaders of groups affiliated with al-Qaeda. This list is called the "high value target list". The U.S. president is not legally required to approve each name added to the list, nor is the CIA required to obtain presidential approval for specific attacks, although the president is kept well informed about operations.

SAC/SOG teams have been dispatched to the country of Georgia, where dozens of al Qaeda fugitives from Afghanistan are believed to have taken refuge with Chechen separatists and thousands of refugees in the Pankisi Gorge. Their efforts have already resulted in 15 Arab militants linked to al Qaeda being captured.

The SAC/SOG teams have also been active in the Philippines, where 1,200 U.S. military advisers helped to train local soldiers in "counter-terrorist operations" against Abu Sayyaf, a radical Islamist group suspected of ties with al Qaeda. Little is known about this U.S. covert action program, but some analysts believe that "the CIA's paramilitary wing, the Special Activities Division (SAD) [referring to SAC's previous name], has been allowed to pursue terrorist suspects in the Philippines on the basis that its actions will never be acknowledged."

On July 14, 2009, several newspapers reported that DCIA Leon Panetta was briefed on a CIA program that had not been briefed to the oversight committees in Congress. Panetta canceled the initiative and reported its existence to Congress and the President. The program consisted of teams of SAC paramilitary officers organized to execute targeted killing operations against al Qaeda operatives around the world in any country. According to the Los Angeles Times, DCIA Panetta "has not ruled out reviving the program." There is some question as to whether former Vice President Dick Cheney instructed the CIA not to inform Congress. Per senior intelligence officers, this program was an attempt to avoid the civilian casualties that can occur during Predator drone strikes using Hellfire missiles.

According to many experts, the Obama administration has relied on the CIA and their paramilitary capabilities, even more than they have on U.S. military forces, to maintain the fight against terrorists in the Afghanistan and Pakistan region, as well as places like Yemen, Somalia and North Africa. Ronald Kessler states in his book The CIA at War: Inside the Secret War Against Terror, that although paramilitary operations are a strain on resources, they are winning the war against terrorism.

SAC/SOG paramilitary officers executed the clandestine evacuation of U.S. citizens and diplomatic personnel in Somalia, Iraq (during the Persian Gulf War) and Liberia during periods of hostility, as well as the insertion of Paramilitary Operations Officers prior to the entry of U.S. military forces in every conflict since World War II. SAC officers have operated covertly since 1947 in places such as North Korea, Vietnam, Laos, Cambodia, Lebanon, Iran, Syria, Libya, Iraq, El Salvador, Guatemala, Colombia, Mexico, Nicaragua, Honduras, Chile, Bosnia and Herzegovina, Serbia, Somalia, Kosovo, Afghanistan and Pakistan.

In the Trump administration, SAC has begun deploying small units of paramilitary officers worldwide to track down terrorists, and they have been given the primary lead for CT operations in Afghanistan.

In 2019, Pulitzer Prize finalist Annie Jacobsen's book, Surprise, Kill, Vanish: The Secret History of CIA Paramilitary Armies, Operators, and Assassins was released. The author refers to CIA's Special Activities Division as "a highly-classified branch of the CIA and the most effective, black operations force in the world." She further states that every American president since World War II has asked the CIA to conduct sabotage, subversion and assassination.

== Innovations in special operations ==
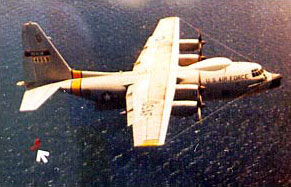
The Fulton system in use

The Fulton surface-to-air recovery system (STARS) is a system developed in the early 1950s by CIA paramilitary officers for retrieving persons from the ground with a MC-130E Combat Talon I aircraft. It uses a harness and a self-inflating balloon that carries an attached lift line. An MC-130E engages the line with its V-shaped yoke, and the individual is reeled on board. Project COLDFEET was a very successful mission in 1962 in which two military officers parachuted into a remote abandoned Soviet site in the Arctic. The two were subsequently extracted by the Fulton sky hook. The team gathered evidence of advanced research on acoustical systems to detect under-ice U.S. submarines and efforts to develop Arctic anti-submarine warfare techniques.

Sergeant Major (SgtMaj) Billy Waugh was a Special Forces soldier attached to the CIA in the 1960s. During his time at MACV-SOG in Vietnam, he developed and conducted the first combat High Altitude-Low Opening (HALO) jump. A practice combat infiltration was conducted in October 1970 by Recon Team Florida into the North Vietnamese held "War Zone D", in South Vietnam, the first such drop into a combat zone. HALO is a method of delivering personnel, equipment, and supplies from a transport aircraft at a high altitude via free-fall parachute insertion. HALO and HAHO (High Altitude-High Opening) are also known as Military Free Fall (MFF). In the HALO technique, the parachutist opens his parachute at a low altitude after free-falling for a period of time to avoid detection by the enemy. Waugh also led the last combat special reconnaissance parachute insertion into enemy territory occupied by communist North Vietnamese Army (NVA) troops on June 22, 1971.

== Notable members ==
- Elliot Ackerman
- George Bacon
- Morris "Moe" Berg
- William Francis Buckley
- William Colby
- Jerry Daniels
- John Downey
- Richard Fecteau
- Thomas "Tom" Fosmire
- Wilbur "Will" Green
- Richard (Dick) Holm
- Bill Lair
- Lloyd C. "Pat" Landry
- Grayston Lynch
- Michael Patrick Mulroy
- Allen Lawrence Pope
- Anthony Poshepny (a.k.a. Tony Poe)
- William "Rip" Robertson
- Felix Rodriguez
- Johnny Micheal Spann
- Gar Thorsrud
- Ernest "Chick" Tsikerdanos
- Michael G. Vickers
- Greg Vogle
- Billy Waugh
- William (Bill) Young
- Douglas A. Zembiec
- Joe Kent

== Notable SAD political action officers ==
- Virginia Hall Goillot (1906–1982)
- E. Howard Hunt (1918–2007)

== CIA Memorial Wall ==
The CIA Memorial Wall is located at CIA headquarters in Langley, Virginia. It honors CIA employees who died in the line of duty. There are 140 stars carved into the marble wall, each one representing an officer. A majority of these were paramilitary officers. A black book, called the "Book of Honor", lies beneath the stars and is encased in an inch-thick plate of glass. Inside this book are stars, arranged by year of death, and the names of 91 employees who died in CIA service alongside them. The other names remain secret, even in death.

Third Option Foundation (TOF) is a national non-profit organization set up to support the families of fallen paramilitary officers. The name refers to the motto of CIA's Special Activities Center: Tertia Optio, the President's third option when military force is inappropriate and diplomacy is inadequate. TOF provides comprehensive family resiliency programs, financial support for the families of paramilitary officers killed in action, and it works behind the scenes to "quietly help those who quietly serve."

== See also ==
- 486th Flight Test Squadron (USAF)
- Action Division – part of the French DGSE
- Clandestine HUMINT and covert action
- Defense Clandestine Service (DIA)
- Defense Intelligence Agency (US)
- Extraordinary rendition
- Foreign Intelligence Service (Russia)
- Foreign internal defense
- Main Directorate of the General Staff of the Armed Forces of the Russian Federation – Russian military intelligence agency
- E Squadron - Equivalent unit of the UK Secret Intelligence Service (MI6)
- Green Light Teams
- State-owned military company
- United States Army Special Forces
- Special tasks unit 404/III – German Federal Intelligence Service
- Wagner Group – Russian paramilitary organization
- Foreign Intelligence Service (Russia)
- Russian irregular units in Ukraine
- New generation warfare Russian version of the cold war generational doctrines
- Fourth-generation warfare U.S. version of cold war generational doctrines

== General and cited references ==
- Coll, Steve (2004). Ghost Wars: The Secret History of the CIA, Afghanistan, and Bin Laden, from the Soviet Invasion to September 10, 2001. The Penguin Press. ISBN 978-1594200076.
- Conboy, Kenneth J.; Morrison, James (1999). Feet to the Fire: CIA Covert Operations in Indonesia, 1957–1958. Naval Institute Press. ISBN 978-1557501936. The history of CIA/IAD's paramilitary operations in Indonesia in the 1950s, detailing the activities of IAD's Ground Air and Maritime Branches, and highlighting the roles of legendary PMCOs Tom Fosmire, Anthony Posephny ("Tony Poe"), Jim Glerum and others.
- Daugherty, William J. (2004). Executive Secrets: Covert Action and the Presidency. Lexington, KY: University of Kentucky Press. ISBN 9780813123349. OCLC 54778478.
- Harnden, Toby (2021). First Casualty: The Untold Story of the CIA Mission to Avenge 9/11. New York: Little, Brown and Company. ISBN 9780316540957. OCLC 1230231021.
- Jacobsen, Annie (2019). Surprise, Kill, Vanish: The Secret History of CIA Paramilitary Armies, Operators, and Assassins. New York: Little, Brown and Company. ISBN 9780316441438. OCLC 1099524601.
- Lynch, Grayston L. (2011) [2000]. Decision for Disaster: Betrayal at the Bay of Pigs. Dulles, VA: Potomac Books. ISBN 9781574882377. OCLC 1058476224.
- Mahoney, Richard D. (2004). Getting Away with Murder: The Real Story Behind American Taliban John Walker Lindh and What the U.S. Government Had to Hide. New York: Arcade Publ. ISBN 9781559707145. OCLC 237878938.
- P., Matt (June 2010). "Hotel California: The Clandestine War Inside Iraq [review]". Intelligence in Public Literature. Studies in Intelligence. 54 (2). Archived from the original on July 7, 2010. Unclassified extracts from the journal.
- Prado, Ric (2021). Black Ops: The Life of a CIA Shadow Warrior. New York: St. Martin's Press. ISBN 9781250271846. OCLC 1342065514.
- Rodríguez, Félix; Weisman, John (1989). Shadow Warrior/the CIA Hero of a Hundred Unknown Battles. New York: Simon & Schuster. ISBN 0671667211. OCLC 20089791.
- Schroen, Gary (2005). First In: An Insider's Account of How the CIA Spearheaded the War on Terror in Afghanistan. New York: Presidio Press/Ballantine Books. ISBN 9780891418726. OCLC 978097473.
- Southworth, Samuel A.; Tanner, Stephen (2002). U.S. Special Forces: A Guide to America's Special Operations Units: The World's Most Elite Fighting Force. Cambridge, MA: Da Capo Press. ISBN 9780306811654. OCLC 54697682.
- Stone, Captain Kathryn (April 7, 2003). "'All Necessary Means': Employing CIA Operatives in a Warfighting Role Alongside Special Operations Forces". USAWC Strategy Research Project. Project Advisor: Professor Anthony R. Williams. Carlisle Barracks, PA: United States Army War College (USAWC). OCLC 834251829.
- Tenet, George; Harlow, Bill (2007). At the Center of the Storm: My Life at the CIA. New York: HarperCollins. ISBN 9780061147784. OCLC 990377270.
- Triay, Victor Andres (2001). Bay of Pigs: An Oral History of Brigade 2506. Gainesville, FL: University Press of Florida. ISBN 9780813020907. OCLC 45505959.
- Tucker, Mike; Faddis, Charles (2008). Operation Hotel California: The Clandestine War Inside Iraq. Guilford, Conn.: The Lyons Press. ISBN 9781599213668. OCLC 258096538.
- Warner, Roger (1996). Shooting at the Moon: The Story of America's Clandestine War in Laos. South Royalton, Vt.: Steerforth Press. ISBN 9781883642365. OCLC 703871664. The history of CIA/IAD'S 15-year involvement in conducting the secret war in Laos, 1960–1975, and the career of CIA PMCO (paramilitary case officer) Bill Lair.
- Woodward, Bob (2004). Plan of Attack. New York: Simon & Schuster. ISBN 9780743255479. OCLC 1336842313.
- Wyden, Peter (1979). Bay of Pigs: The Untold Story. New York: Simon and Schuster. ISBN 9780671240066. OCLC 5707118.
