= Ernest "Chick" Tsikerdanos =

American soldier

Ernest John "Chick" Tsikerdanos (June 2, 1924 – December 8, 1997) was a veteran of OSS, 82nd Airborne. He served in Burma with the OSS Detachment 101. Tsikerdanos had a close relationship with General and Madame Chiang Kai-shek and was held in high esteem by them and other Chinese Nationalist leaders. On the last day of the war, August 9, 1945, Tsikerdanos was wounded in the right eye by a Japanese mortar shell fragment when his battalion of Burmese Kachin irregulars were ambushed while moving across a valley. After leaving the service, Tsikerdanos joined CIA's famed Special Activities Division (SAD) and was assigned to Taiwan where he ran cross-channel reconnaissance and harassment operations into Red China from Nationalist-held islands. He served multiple tours in Greece, and later was entrusted with the difficult assignment of cleaning up the large mess of internal "dirt" files collected over twenty-five years by the paranoid former CIA Chief, James Jesus Angleton, after Angleton's forced retirement. After his own retirement, Tsikerdanos returned to CIA as a Contract Case Officer, working with distinction in the Agency's Counterterrorism Center for several years. He was personally engaged against some of the most dangerous terrorist suspects in Europe. He died on 8 December 1997 at the age of 73, after being diagnosed with cancer.
