= Grayston Lynch =

Central Intelligence Agency officer

Grayston LeRoy Lynch
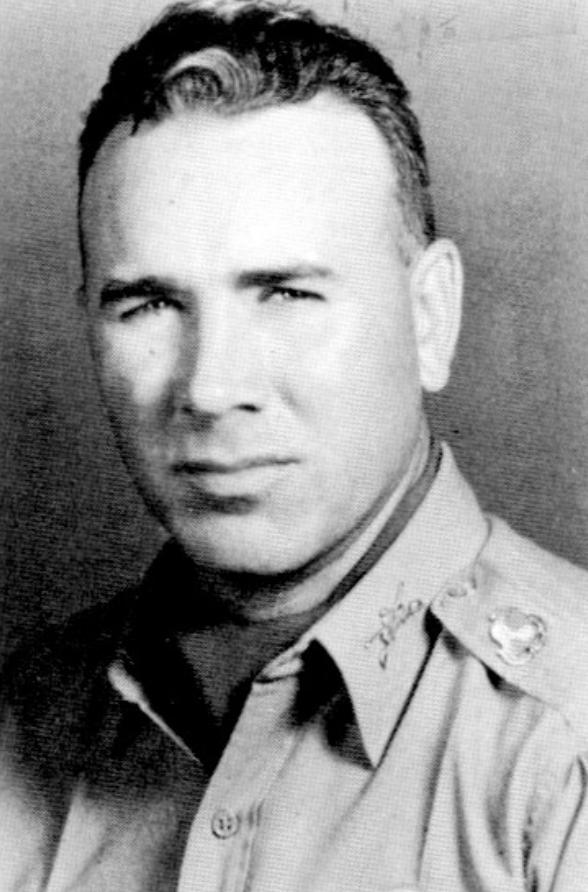
- Lynch in 1950
- Born: June 14, 1923; Gilmer, Texas, U.S.
- Died: August 10, 2008 (aged 85); Tampa, Florida, U.S.
- Education: University of Maryland, College Park (BA)
- Military career
- Allegiance: United States of America
- Branch: United States Army; Central Intelligence Agency; Bureau of Narcotics and Dangerous Drugs; Drug Enforcement Administration
- Service years: 1938–1960 (Army); 1960–1971 (CIA); 1971–1978 (BNDD/DEA)
- Nickname: "Gray"
- Units: Army Special Forces; MACV-SOG; Special Activities Division
- Conflicts: World War II; Korean War; Cold War; Bay of Pigs Invasion; Operation Mongoose; Vietnam War; Project Hotfoot
- Awards: Intelligence Star; Silver Star (2); Bronze Star Medal (1); Purple Heart (3)

Grayston LeRoy Lynch (June 14, 1923 – August 10, 2008) was an American soldier and CIA officer. He was one of only two CIA officers who commanded Brigade 2506 troops at the Bay of Pigs Invasion. The other CIA officer was William "Rip" Robertson.

Lynch was raised in Victoria, Texas, and was the son of an oil driller. He was wounded at Normandy, the Battle of the Bulge, and Heartbreak Ridge in Korea; served with the Special Forces in Laos; and received three Purple Hearts, two Silver Stars and one Bronze Star with a "V" for valor, among other awards. He was selected from the elite to become a Paramilitary Operations Officer in the CIA's famed Special Activities Division in 1960.

For his actions at the Bay of Pigs, Lynch was awarded the Intelligence Star, the CIA's most coveted award. In the six years after the Bay of Pigs invasion, he ran commando raids into Cuba. Lynch retired from the CIA in 1971.

== Military service ==
Born June 14, 1923, in Gilmer, Texas, Lynch lied about his age by claiming to be born in 1920 and enlisted in the U.S. Army in 1938 and was assigned to 5th Cavalry at Fort Clark, Texas. During World War II he was assigned to the Second Division as platoon sergeant. During D-day he landed at Omaha Beach and then fought in the Battle of the Bulge where he was seriously wounded. He served in the Korean War with the Second Division as Second Lt., promoted to First Lt., wounded at Battle of Bloody Ridge. Later served in Laos with 77th Special Forces Group as Captain, retiring from them in 1960.

== Education ==
Lynch received a Bachelor of Arts degree in political science from the University of Maryland, College Park in 1953.

== CIA career, 1960–1971 ==
In 1960 he joined the Central Intelligence Agency (CIA) working under Theodore Shackley. Lynch spent the majority of his time between Key West and Miami.

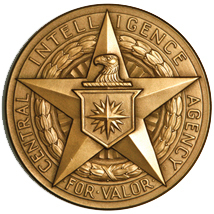
Intelligence Star of the CIA.

=== Bay of Pigs ===
Lynch was transported to Cuba aboard the SS Blagar.

No Americans were authorized to land on the beaches of Cuba during the Bay of Pigs Invasion. Lynch defied this order, leading command of Brigade 2506 onto the beach at Playa Girón. Lynch did this because from his perspective the mission was going wrong from the beginning: the second round of aerial bombardments that had been promised from Operation Puma had not hit their intended targets in support of Operation Pluto, naval assets were lost, and he was informed by Washington that Cuban air forces still had air superiority.

In an interview with Bill Moyers and George Crile, Lynch said:

"We were hit just after daylight by [Castro's] planes. They continued to hit us all morning. We lost two ships — sunk. We could not unload the ammunition for the brigade. The brigade went ashore carrying one day's supply of ammunition. That's all."

Over the radio from Washington, Lynch was promised aid that never arrived.

The Bay of Pigs Invasion was a complete failure, with Operation Pluto resulting in over a thousand men captured by the Castro government, Operation Mars being called off, and Operation Puma dropping less than half of its promised payloads. Lynch became one of the many people on the ground that day who believed that the invasion was betrayed by the Kennedy Administration, either through a series of bad command decisions, or deliberate sabotage attempts by members of the Administration.

=== Commando raids and Operation Mongoose ===
After the Bay of Pigs, Lynch began conducting paramilitary training of Cuban exiles at JMWAVE and conducted commando raids inside Cuba for six years. He personally led over 100 raids into Cuba. When asked the specific number of raids he embarked upon, his response was:

"This was spread over many years that we had — other captains have had, I don't know, maybe 100. 150. We had people who went inside of Cuba on operations — 50, 60, 70, 80 times. It’s just a long war."

At the beginning of Operation Mongoose, the United States Coast Guard were not made aware of the clandestine nature of the missions, causing several instances of interference – Lynch was often forced to tell the commander of a Coast Guard vessel to contact their superiors. However, an arrangement was eventually made where a countersign passphrase was issued in a sealed envelope to Mongoose operators. If these operators were questioned by the Coast Guard, they would call the passphrase, and the Coast Guard would let them pass.

== DEA career, 1971–1978 ==
=== BNDD Career (DEA), 1971 to 1973 ===
Lynch joined the Bureau of Narcotics and Dangerous Drugs (BNDD) which would later be dissolved and merged into the Drug Enforcement Administration (DEA).

=== BUNCIN Career (DEACON), 1973 to 1978 ===
Lynch was recruited by Lucien Conien into Bureau of Narcotics Counter-Intelligence Network (BUNCIN), later renamed DEA Clandestine Operations Network (DEACON) after the Bureau of Narcotics and Dangerous Drugs (BNDD) was renamed Drug Enforcement Administration (DEA). Bob Medell requisitioned Grayston Lynch to work directly with him in BUNCIN. Lynch's primary task was to identify offshore suppliers of illegal drugs. Lynch had been running secret CIA operations in Cuba, Central and South America for many years and developed numerous clandestine resources.

== Published works ==
Lynch wrote a book, Decision for Disaster: Betrayal at the Bay of Pigs, based on his experience leading the rebel Brigade 2506.
