= Mary Ann Harbert =

U.S. prisoner in China, 1968-1971

Mary Ann Harbert (born 27 December 1945) is an American who was held captive in China from 1968 to 1971.

== Early life and education ==
Harbert was born in Arlington, Virginia. She grew up in Denver until she reached the age of twelve. After that, her father's employment with the U.S. Geological Survey took the family to Vernon, Texas, Glasgow, Montana, Austin, Texas, Lampasas, Texas, Boise, Idaho (where she first met McLaughlin), Safford, Arizona, Redwood City, California, Bend, Oregon, Delta, Utah, Carson City, Nevada and Salt Lake City.

After graduating from East High School, she attended the University of Utah before joining her parents in Jeddah, Saudi Arabia. She attended college in Beirut, later returning to Salt Lake City to finish her psychology degree. She graduated from the University of Utah in 1968. After completing her degree, she joined her parents, who now lived in Menlo Park, California.

== Detention in China ==
=== Capture and captivity ===
On 18 April 1968, Harbert flew to Hong Kong to meet family friend Gerald Ross McLaughlin and help him sail a yacht back from Hong Kong to the United States.

On 21 April 1968, as Harbert and McLaughlin were sailing from Hong Kong to Manila, The Philippines, they crossed into Chinese waters near Dangan Island, south of Hong Kong where they were captured.

After they failed to report from Manila, Harbert's family notified the United States Coast Guard; however, after receiving no news of her, they assumed that she had been lost at sea. China made no statement that Harbert and McLaughlin had been captured.

Harbert reported that for most of her time in captivity she was held in a small farmhouse on a rural commune near Canton.

=== Release ===
Due to improving U.S.-China relations Harbert, and Richard G. Fecteau, who had been captured on an aircraft forced down over China in 1952, were released on 13 December 1971, crossing the land border into Hong Kong where they were received by representatives of the U.S. consular officials. The consular officials had no knowledge of Harbert and were surprised by her release. Harbert and Fecteau were flown by helicopter to Kai Tak Airport and then boarded a United States Air Force aeromedical evacuation jet and flown to Clark Air Base, then Hawaii and then on to McGuire Air Force Base.

In an official statement made by Xinhua News Agency at the time of her release, the Chinese government said that McLaughlin had "behaved badly" during detention, "resisted investigation and, taking the warders unawares committed suicide on March 7, 1969" whereas Harbert had "admitted her mistakes". The statement implied that she, McLaughlin and Fecteau were all Central Intelligence Agency spies. Harbert later denied that she was a spy.

Harbert's family was stunned by her release having given her up for dead three years previously. Harbert and Fecteau were taken to Valley Forge Military Hospital where she was found to be in good health.

In 1973, Harbert wrote a book about her captivity titled Captivity: How I Survived 44 Months as a Prisoner of the Red Chinese.
