= William "Rip" Robertson =

American marine and CIA officer (1920–1970)

William Alexander Robertson Jr.
- Born: August 3, 1920; Manard, Oklahoma, U.S.
- Died: December 10, 1970 (aged 50); Dallas, Texas, U.S.
- Burial place: Arlington National Cemetery, Arlington County, Virginia, U.S.
- Alma mater: Vanderbilt University
- Military career
- Allegiance: United States of America
- Branch: United States Marine Corps; Central Intelligence Agency
- Rank: Major (USMC); Paramilitary Operations Officer (CIA)
- Nickname: Rip
- Unit: Special Activities Division
- Conflicts: World War II; Korean War

William Alexander "Rip" Robertson Jr. (August 3, 1920 – December 1, 1970) was a United States Marine Corps officer—a combat veteran of the World War II and the Korean War—and a Central Intelligence Agency Case Officer in the 1950s, 1960s and 1970, in what became the Special Activities Division (renamed Special Activities Center in 2016). Robertson was one of the two CIA officers who commanded the faction of the army that went to war in the Bay of Pigs Invasion. The other agent was Grayston Lynch.

He died in December 1970 of malaria he contracted in Laos, and is interred at Arlington National Cemetery.

== Biography ==
=== Early life and military service ===
Robertson was born on August 3, 1920, in Manard, Muskogee County, Oklahoma, to William Alexander Robertson Sr. (1893–1952) and Caroline Ellen "Callie" Robertson (née Harris; 1896–1981). After graduating from high school, he attended Vanderbilt University before and after the war. During World War II he enlisted in the United States Marine Corps and served in the Pacific Theater as a Captain and served during the Korean War, retiring at the rank of Major.

=== Central Intelligence Agency ===
He entered the Central Intelligence Agency (CIA) in 1947 and served as a Paramilitary Operations Officer in their famed Special Activities Division. In 1954 he was one of a handful of paramilitary case officers assigned to the CIA task force charged by President Dwight D. Eisenhower with destabilizing the democratically elected government of President of Guatemala Jacobo Arbenz. This covert action operation was accomplished in a straightforward manner through psychological warfare measures designed and managed by CIA propaganda and psy-ops experts David Phillips and Howard Hunt. From a secret radio transmitter located on Swan Island, off the Honduran coast, Phillips and Hunt scripted and broadcast a steady and increasingly bellicose stream of false news reports from a so-called "insurgent radio station" that was supposedly located in the mountains of Guatemala. Meanwhile, Robertson and his colleagues brought a relatively small unit of armed and trained guerrillas into the countryside outside of Guatemala City to make loud but non-lethal demonstrations of force. The combination of alarmist false radio broadcasts and loud explosions detonated by Robertson in the countryside succeeded splendidly in convincing Arbenz and his troops that a large well-armed insurgent "army" was poised outside the capital preparing to attack at any moment. These efforts, punctuated by the fly-over of the capital by a couple of CIA-controlled fighter-bombers with Nicaraguan Air Force markings and dropping a couple of bombs, convinced Arbenz that his own pilots had defected to the anti-government insurgency and that his capital was about to fall. Arbenz hurriedly fled the country, thus accomplishing President Eisenhower's order with virtually no bloodshed.

In a subsequent Central American operation, a team of guerrillas led by Robertson mis-identified a British cargo ship for a Soviet freighter at anchor in a Nicaraguan harbor that was thought to be en route to Cuba with arms and ordnance for Fidel Castro. Robertson's guerrillas mined the vessel, sinking it in the harbor and killing some British seamen, resulting in an international uproar and a diplomatic demarche from London. Robertson accepted responsibility for the operation and although he was dismissed from the Agency by the chief of the CIA's Western Hemisphere Division, Colonel J.C. King—reportedly on Eisenhower's orders—Robertson was never considered to be an outcast by his CIA colleagues.

Robertson remained in Nicaragua, where he acquired large tracts of farmland near Puerto Cabezas on the Caribbean coast and went into the coffee business. He was thus well positioned to provide covert assistance to CIA when it began the search for remote sites to train Cuban exiles. Robertson offered such a site which became the principal training camp for what was to become Brigade 2506, which subsequently landed at the Bay of Pigs in 1961. At this time, Robertson was re-employed by the Agency on a contract (vice staff) basis to help lead the 2506 Brigade during the 1961 invasion of Cuba. During the battle he commanded the ship Barbara J while Grayston Lynch commanded the ship Blagar. Robertson and Lynch both went ashore to supervise the brigade from the beach. Both Robertson and Lynch were under fire for several hours until they were ordered by Washington off the beach—an order which they reluctantly obeyed.

During Operation l'Ommegang, Robertson subsequently led a unit of 17 Cuban exiles in the Congo Crisis. in an attempt to rescue an international group of missionaries being held hostage by rebel factions during the Simba Rebellion. Their original target included CIA agents in the Orientale Province, and especially around Stanleyville. But the Belgian Red Berets got to them first. During Operation Dragon Rouge (Operation Red Dragon) his team managed to rescue 24 of 25 stranded missionaries at the Kilometer 8 mission just north of Stanleyville during a heated gun battle to and from the Mission 8 complex.

Robertson left Laos in November 1970 on an emergency evacuation due to the effects of Malaria.

=== Death ===
He died in Dallas, Texas, on December 1, 1970. Death was due to the effects of malaria. Originally buried at Culpeper National Cemetery, Robertson was interred at Arlington National Cemetery on June 14, 1977. He was married to Sara James West (1925–2019) and they had a son together.
