= Exceptional Service Medallion =

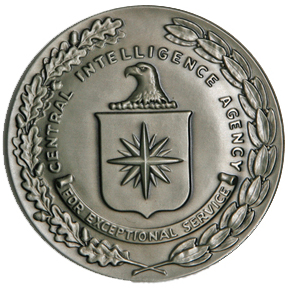
- Awarded for: "injury or death resulting from service in an area of hazard."
- Country: United States of America
- Presented by: Central Intelligence Agency
- Eligibility: Employees of the Central Intelligence Agency
- Formerly called: Exceptional Service Emblem
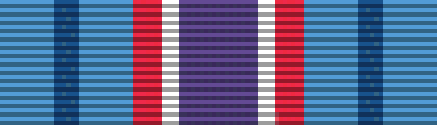

Precedence
- Next (higher): Intelligence Commendation Medal
- Next (lower): Hostile Action Service Medal
- Related: Purple Heart, Defense of Freedom Medal

The Exceptional Service Medallion is a civilian decoration of the United States government. It is awarded by the Central Intelligence Agency in recognition of "an employee's injury or death resulting from service in a hazardous area." It was previously known as the Exceptional Service Emblem.

== Recipients ==
- John T. Downey (1974)
- James A. Rawlings (1976)
- John Anthony Celli III (1997)
- Johnny Micheal Spann (2001)
- Helge Boes (2003)

== See also ==
- Awards and decorations of the United States government
