= Tail number =

A tail number refers to an identification registration code (letters, numbers, or both) painted on an aircraft, frequently on the tail.

Tail numbers can represent:

- An aircraft registration number (civil aviation)
- United States military aircraft serials

== See also ==
- Vehicle Identification Number
- Hull number
- Pennant number
- Tail code, which is not a unique identifier
- Fin flash, also called tail flash
