= John T. Downey =

American judge and CIA officer

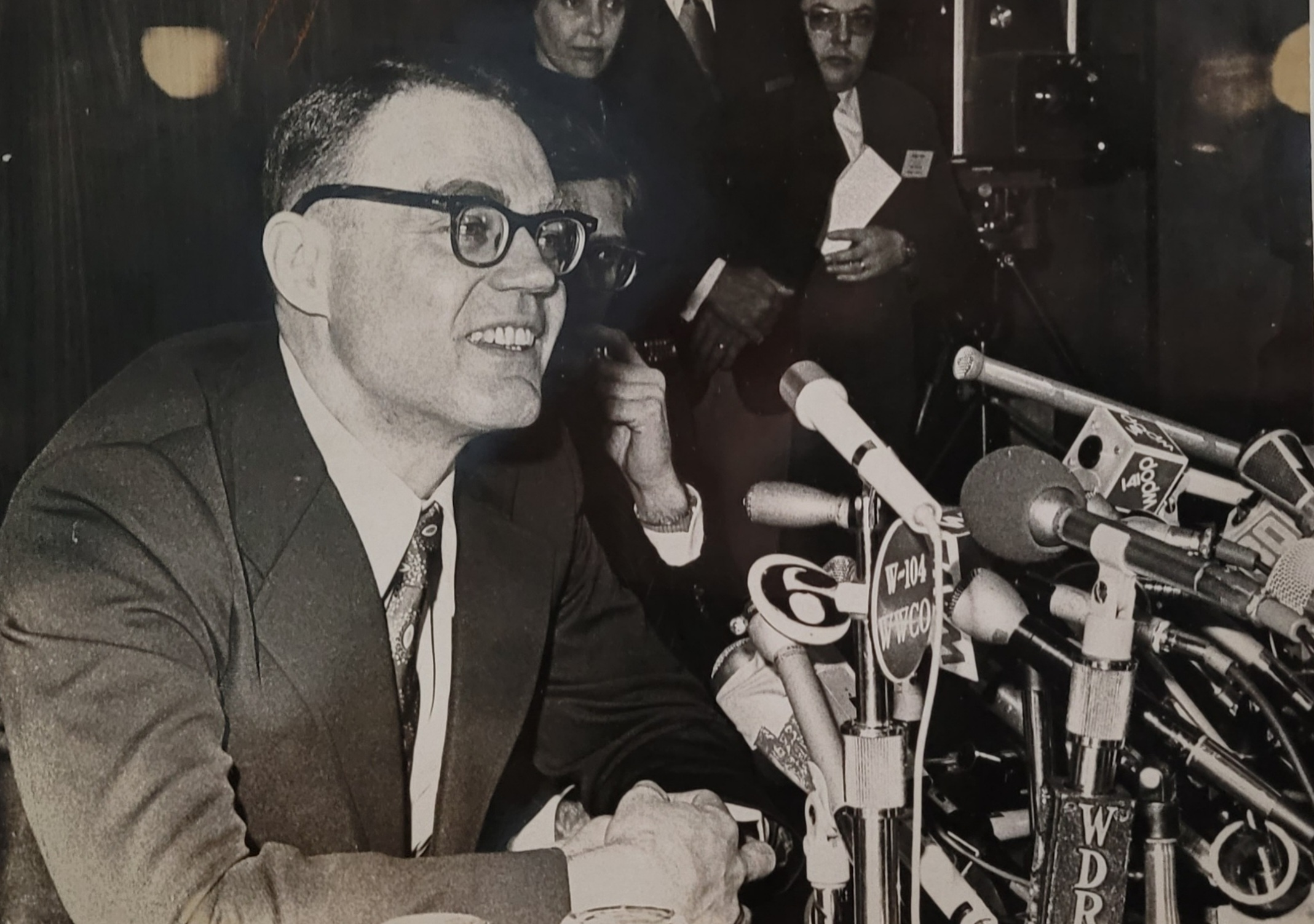
- Downey giving a press conference in 1973
- Born: John Thomas Downey; April 19, 1930; Wallingford, Connecticut, U.S.
- Died: November 17, 2014 (aged 84); Branford, Connecticut
- Other name: Jack Downey
- Education: Yale University; Harvard Law School
- Occupations: Connecticut Superior Court Judge, CIA officer
- Known for: Longest interned POW in U.S. history
- Awards: Exceptional Service Medallion; Distinguished Intelligence Medal; CIA Director's Medal; Distinguished Intelligence Cross

John Thomas Downey or Jack Downey (April 19, 1930 – November 17, 2014) was an American judge and Central Intelligence Agency (CIA) officer. As a CIA operative, he was shot down over China during the Korean War and was held prisoner for over twenty years. While Downey was never part of the US military, the CIA described him as the longest-held prisoner of war in United States history.

Downey later served on the Connecticut Superior Court and became Chief Administrative Judge for Juvenile Matters.

== Early life ==
Downey was born in Wallingford, Connecticut. His parents were John E. Downey, a probate judge, and Mary V. His grandfather served in the Connecticut General Assembly. His father died in a car accident when Downey was eight years old. Downey, his two siblings, and his mother moved to New Britain, Connecticut where his mother was a middle school teacher.

Downey went to Saint Joseph's School through 1943. He attended The Choate School where he earned academic scholarships and was class president, captain of the wrestling team, and vice president of The Choate Athletic Association. He was also a member of the choral club, glee club, honor committee, and the student council. He served on the board of Choate's Literary Magazine and was on the staff of The Choate News. In January 1947, he received an award from Yale's Aurelian Honor Society for outstanding character, leadership, and scholarship. He graduated from Choate in 1947.

He also received academic scholarships for Yale University, graduating with a B.A. in English in 1951. At Yale, he was a member of the social and literary fraternity St. Anthony Hall and played on the football, rugby, and wrestling teams. After college, he planned to attend law school and, then, enter politics. However, Downey was recruited by the CIA in the spring of his senior year.

== Career ==
=== CIA operative ===
While still a senior in college, Downey began his CIA training at Fort Benning in Columbus, Georgia, learning to parachute out of planes. He also trained at a CIA facility near Washington, D.C., learning "clandestine skills like weapons training and dead drops, a method of secretly passing information between spies." He did not tell his family or friends that he had joined the CIA. Rather, he said he had taken a job in Asia that was connected to the Korean War. Downey later said, "There was a sense of urgency because of the Korean War. It felt like the future of mankind was at stake."

==== Third Force ====
After a year of training, Downey traveled to a secret compound in Japan that was part of the United States Korean War effort called Third Force or Operation Tropic. The goal of Third Force was to recruit and train a network of Chinese ex-pats as operatives who could infiltrate China, create a guerrilla force, and identify disaffected Chinese generals who could destabilize China. By no fault of Downey, the Third Force program ultimately failed; CIA historian Nicholas Dujmovic stated, "The whole program smacked of amateurism."

Downey was assigned to select, train, and oversee a team of Chinese operatives. In April 1952, his first team of four operatives were air-dropped into southern China and were never heard from again. In July 1952, his second four-man team parachuted into Manchuria and successfully established radio contact with Downey. The CIA assigned a Chinese courier to Downey's team as a radio operator and who would communicate between the team of operatives and Downey at the CIA base. The courier was air-dropped to Manchuria in September 1952. The mission was completed in November and the courier radioed for extraction.

On November 29, 1952, two pilots, Downey, and a newly arrived CIA paramilitary officer Richard Fecteau took an unarmed C-47 Skytrain airplane into China to extract the courier via a snatch pickup. This was the first time the CIA had tried the snatch pickup maneuver—something declared too risky to do by the United States Air Force and no Chinese operatives were trained in operating the pulley system used to raise the man on the ground. As a result, Downey and Fecteau were called on for the extraction operation over enemy territory—the first operational mission for both men.

==== Capture ====
As they flew to the pickup spot in Manchuria by night, they dropped supplies and food to the operative team, along with the harness for the snatch pickup. The plane made a second pass 45 minutes later; Downey's view through the cargo doors showed the courier ready on the ground. As the pilots began a descent, they were ambushed: "Snow-colored sheets snapped back to reveal two anti-aircraft guns on either side of the plane, which started to fire simultaneously." The C-47's engine was disabled by bullets, and it began to crash through a nearby forest. When the plane finally hit the ground, it broke into two parts. Except for a bullet that had grazed Downey's cheek, he and Fecteau emerged from the crash with just bruises and scrapes; however, the pilots were killed because the leaking fuel had ignited in the cockpit.

Downey and Fecteau were immediately captured. A Chinese officer told them in English, "Your future is very dark." Then, the officer asked, "Who is Jack Downey?" One of the operatives who was recruited and trained by Downey quickly identified his handler. Afterwards, the CIA concluded that its Third Force operatives "had been turned immediately after being dropped into China" and Downey's mission was a trap. However, Downey said, "I found out later at our trial that our Chinese radio operator had been forced to cooperate." Because of a CIA blunder, all of Third Force's Chinese operatives had trained together with Downey, so the entire program was at risk by the capture or turning of just one agent.

A few hours after the airplane was shot down, a radio message was sent to the CIA field base indicating that the operation had gone according to plans and that the airplane was on its way back to base. However, on the morning of November 30, the C-47 did not return. The CIA came up with a cover story for the missing men, saying that a commercial flight with two pilots and two U.S. Defense Department civilian employees had disappeared somewhere over the Sea of Japan while flying from South Korea to Japan—changing the date to four days after the actual covert operation. The United States military searched the area but failed to come up with any leads.

Downey's mother received a telegram from CIA Director Walter Bedell Smith on December 7, 1952, stating that her son was a passenger on a routine commercial flight that was overdue. Smith wrote, "There is grave fear that he may have been lost." When the Chinese failed to notify the United States of Downey and Fecteau's capture, CIA analysts incorrectly concluded that the men were dead rather than captured. Smith notified their families that their sons were officially "presumed dead" on December 4, 1953.

==== Imprisonment ====
Meanwhile, Downey was transported by truck and train to Mukden (now Shenyang) some 400 miles (640 km) away. He was imprisoned, shackled with leg irons, interrogated, and isolated by solitary confinement. He was interrogated in four-hour sessions—sometimes for up to 24 hours a day—often days at a time. Sleep deprivation was part of the torture. For weeks, he was allowed to sleep for only 30 minutes at a time. Sometimes, he was made to stand for hours on end. Downey attempted to provide a false background story—made up on the spot as neither Downey nor Fecteau were prepared for capture—but struggled to keep his lies straight under the stresses of torture. After this psychological torture, Downey and Fecteau both gave the Chinese U.S. intelligence to varying degrees. Downey realized, "There was no end to what I was facing." Furthermore, the Chinese had already interrogated all eight of the operatives he had trained. Downey cried as he admitted being a CIA operative after sixteen days; he was "convinced that he'd betrayed his country." Downey's training was inadequate for this situation. Fecteau said, "We had none [training], and it really hurt me. I had to play it by ear as I went along, and I was never sure whether I was right or wrong."

Downey was moved to another prison in Beijing after five months. There, he was kept in solitary confinement in a 5 feet x 8 feet cell which was lit by a 15-watt bulb that was never turned off. He remained here until November 1954 when he was given a new suit to wear and was taken to a Chinese military tribunal. This was the first time Downey and Fecteau had seen each other in two years. At their trial, which also was the trial for the eight Chinese operatives, they were all convicted of espionage and spying. Four of the Chinese operatives were sentenced to life imprisonment; four were sentenced to death. Fecteau was given a twenty-year sentence and Downey was sentenced to life imprisonment as the "arch-criminal of all American prisoners."

Downey was returned to solitary confinement. However, in January of the next year, Downey and Fecteau were moved to shared living quarters with eleven American crewmen who were shot down over China just weeks after Downey's crash. In addition to people to talk to, there was also an outdoor space with a volleyball court. However, after three weeks, the airmen were released, and Downey went back to solitary confinement. After four years of prison, Downey learned to survive the isolation by developing a strict routine. He jogged every day, read the Bible, and studied French and Russian. There were also daily indoctrination sessions, reading and discussing Marxist literature and listening to anti-Western propaganda on Radio Peking. Meals consisted of rice, occasional meat and vegetables, and peanut butter and vitamins sent by the Red Cross.

==== Release ====
After the trial on November 23, 1954, the Chinese News Agency announced that it had captured and tried two American spies, letting the United States and Downey's family know he was alive. The Eisenhower administration immediately protested. Because their status as CIA officers was a secret, the U.S. Government claimed Downey and Fecteau were civilian employees of United States Army. This complicated the efforts of U.S. officials, family members, and others to press for the men's release or even to make their plight widely known. When Chinese Premier Zhou Enlai expressed willingness to discuss Downey and Fecteau's release and invited their families to visit, U.S. Secretary of State John Foster Dulles rejected his offer, forbade visits by their relatives, and claimed China had committed the "reprehensible" crime of holding Americans on "trumped up charges." Zhou even offered to release the two men if the United States would admit they were CIA agents; the United States declined to respond.

In 1957, Zhou again offered to release Downey and Fecteau, this time if the United States would let American journalists visit China. Dulles rejected what he called "blackmail" and used his authority over passports to deny Americans access to China. Daniel Aaron Rubin wrote, "The Secretary's extraordinary animosity toward the Chinese Communists and communism in general, combined with the tendency toward over-simplification and exaggeration, precluded him from cooperating with the Chinese." However, in 1958, Downey's mother and brother both went to China.

When President Richard Nixon reestablished relations with China in 1971, Fecteau was released in December 1971 after serving nineteen years, and Downey's sentence was commuted to time served, plus five years. Eighteen months later, encouraged by Downey's mother, Nixon publicly admitted Downey's connection to the CIA on January 31, 1973. The Chinese announced that Downey would be released by the end of 1973. However, when Downey's mother had a severe stroke on March 7, 1973, Nixon personally asked Zhou to release Downey as a "humanitarian gesture." Downey was released on March 9, 1973, after twenty years, three months, and two weeks of imprisonment. He returned to Connecticut just as his mother started to recover.

After his release, Downey provided little information about his capture and imprisonment publicly, turning down requests for interviews and book offers. He did talk to People magazine in 1978, but the reporter found what he called a "self-imposed silence." In a 1983 interview, Downey emphasized the role Dulles played in extending his prison term by sixteen years.

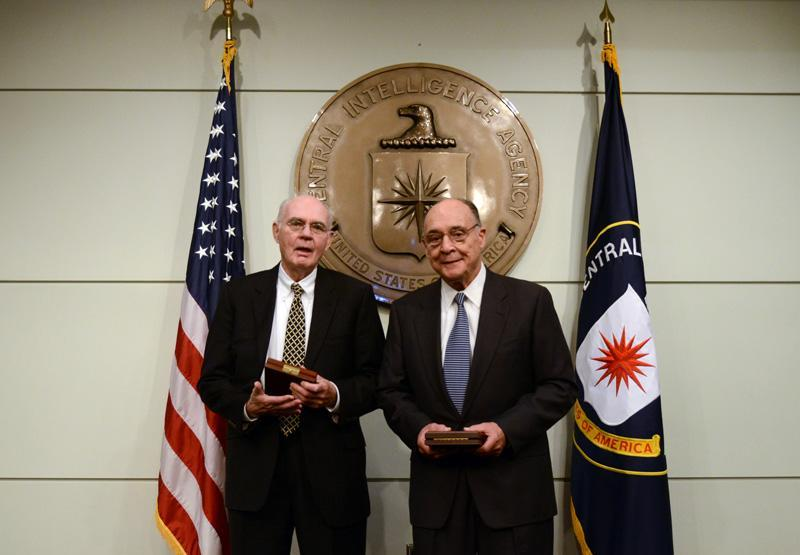
Downey (left) and Fecteau at CIA headquarters in 2013

The CIA offered Downey continued employment and gave him back pay of $170,000. Downey was surprised by this amount, as he was paid only $4,000 a year when he was captured. However, CIA Director Allen Dulles had instituted a schedule of promotions and raises in his absence, eventually reaching $22,000 a year. His accrued salaries were kept in Series E savings bonds. When the amount exceeded that allowed by bond policy, money was deposited into bank savings accounts under false names. In 1964, some of the money was invested through a covert proprietary company. During his captivity, the CIA also gave an allotment of $700 a year from his salary to his mother which allowed her to purchase and mail food and vitamins to Downey.

In 2006, the CIA's Studies in Intelligence included an article describing the mission, the capture, and, ultimately, the release of agents Downey and Fecteau. In 2008, the CIA declassified the internal side of the incident. The CIA commissioned a 60-minute documentary film, Extraordinary Fidelity, on the men's experiences in 2010. Although created for internal training, the film was also shared through the CIA's website in 2011.

=== Legal and public service ===
Downey enrolled in Harvard Law School in the fall of 1973 at the age of 43, graduating in 1976. During this time, he was paid by the CIA through accumulated leave, sick leave, and convalescent leave. He passed the Connecticut Bar Exam on September 24, 1976. He then entered private practice with Corrozzela, Richardson & Hill, a firm in Willington, Connecticut. John A. Corrozzela was Downey's former classmate at The Choate School and Yale, where they were both on the wrestling team. He stayed in private practice for two years.

In July 1977, Connecticut Governor Ella Grasso appointed Downey to a six-year term on the State Personnel Appeal Board. On the board, Downey served as an arbitrator in disciplinary hearings. He served until January 1, 1978, when Grasso appointed him Connecticut's first Secretary of the Department of Business Relations. The Department of Business Relations was considered a good fit for Downey who "lacked government experience" as its function was limited to budgetary and administrative authority over the divisions of banking, consumer counsel, insurance, liquor control, and public utilities.

On June 20, 1978, Downey began an unsuccessful run for Lieutenant Governor of Connecticut as a Democrat. However, Governor Grasso appointed him Commissioner of the Connecticut Public Utility Control Authority in 1979. In 1980, Downey was appointed to the board of trustees of Quinnipiac College.

In April 1981, he resigned from the Public Utility Control Authority, announcing that he was running for the U.S. Senate on October 20, 1981. Downey said he wanted to repay Connecticut for not forgetting him while he was imprisoned in China. He said, "I approach the whole task with a sense of obligation as well as ambition and a sense of duty." However, he experienced a "crushing defeat" in the Democratic primary in May 1982.

In 1984, newly elected Governor William O'Neill appointed Downey to another term on the Utility Control Authority; he became its chairman in 1985. Downey was appointed to fill a vacancy on the Connecticut Superior Court by Governor O'Neill on July 10, 1987. He became Chief Administrative Judge for Juvenile Matters in 1990. He retired in 1997 but still worked part-time as a judge trial referee in New Haven Judicial District Court until 2013.

== Professional affiliations ==
Downey was a member of the National Council of Juvenile and Family Court Judges and the New Haven County Bar Association. He was a member of the Advisory Committee to the Office of the Child Advocate and the Rules Committee of the Superior Court.

He served on the Children and Law Committee, the Connecticut Bar Association Children and Law Committee, the Committee on Liaison with the State Courts, and Legislative Task Force on Combating Drug Problems Among Children and Juveniles.

== Honors and awards ==
- He received the Exceptional Service Medallion and Distinguished Intelligence Medal from the CIA in 1974.
- On June 4, 1977, the American Legion Shaw-Simon Post 73 honored Downey at a testimonial dinner.
- He received the Robert C. Zampano Award for Excellence in Mediation in May 1995.
- In June 1998, he received the CIA Director's Medal for service by CIA Director George J. Tenet.
- Children in Placement created the John T. Downey Award in 2001; he was the first recipient.
- The New Haven Juvenile Matters Courthouse and Detention Center became the John T. Downey Courthouse in his honor on September 25, 2002.
- He was inducted into the Choate Rosemary Hall Athletic Hall of Fame in 2004.
- In 2004, he served as an associate fellow of Timothy Dwight College at Yale University.
- On June 18, 2007, the Connecticut Bar Association honored him with the Henry J. Naruk Judiciary Award.
- He received a National Clandestine Service Medal from the CIA's East Asia Division in 2010.
- In 2013, he was given an honorary plaque from the Henry C. Lee College of the University of New Haven.
- He received an Honorary Doctorate of Humane Letters from Albertus Magnus College in 2013.
- He was presented the CIA's Distinguished Intelligence Cross on December 9, 2013.

== Assessment ==
Historian Roger B. Jeans offered the following assessment of the Downey-Fecteau mission:

Rather than dwell on the tragic fate of Downey and Fecteau, which was the direct result of the CIA’s mistakes and stubborn refusal to admit the two men were on an agency mission, the CIA emphasized the “exemplary manner” with which it had treated the men and their families over their two-decades-long ordeal. It had partly “redeemed itself,” it claimed, “through its later care for the men from whom years had been stolen.”

Missing was an explanation of the twenty-year cover-up of the two men’s CIA spy mission as well as an apology or the role that the refusal to come clean played in prolonging Downey’s and Fecteau’s agony past 1957.

— Roger B. Jeans, The CIA and Third Force Movements in China during the Early Cold War

== Publications ==
=== Books ===
- Lost in the Cold War: The Story of Jack Downey, America's Longest-Held POW, with Thomas J. Christensen. New York: Columbia University Press, 2022. ISBN 9780231199124.
- Jeans, Roger B. The CIA and Third Force Movements in China during the Early Cold War. Lanham: Rowman & Littlefield, 2018. ISBN 978-149-8570-05-3.

== Personal life ==
Downey and his Chinese-born wife, Audrey Lee, were married in May 1975. They met at Yale after his return from China when he was taking a summer class in Russian (to test his self-study in prison) and she was working on an advanced degree in chemistry. She was born just miles from the prison in Shenyang where Downey was first kept and came to the United States shortly after his capture. They had one son, Jack Lee Downey, in 1980.

In August 1983, the couple decided to return to China to visit Audrey's family for three weeks. Before the trip, Downey met with President Ronald Reagan and Vice-President George H. W. Bush at the White House. Reagan and Bush believed his visit would enhance relations between the United States and China. Downey said, "It was pretty obvious that they attach some significance to the trip. It's a gesture of friendship, a gesture of friendship, a gesture of goodwill. ...This is not an official trip, but I certainly have their good wishes and encouragement."

Downey died in hospice care at Branford, Connecticut, on November 17, 2014, aged 84, from pancreatic cancer and Parkinson's disease.
