= CIA Memorial Wall =

Memorial to CIA employees

Coordinates: 38.951796°N 77.146586°W

Memorial Wall
- Central Intelligence Agency
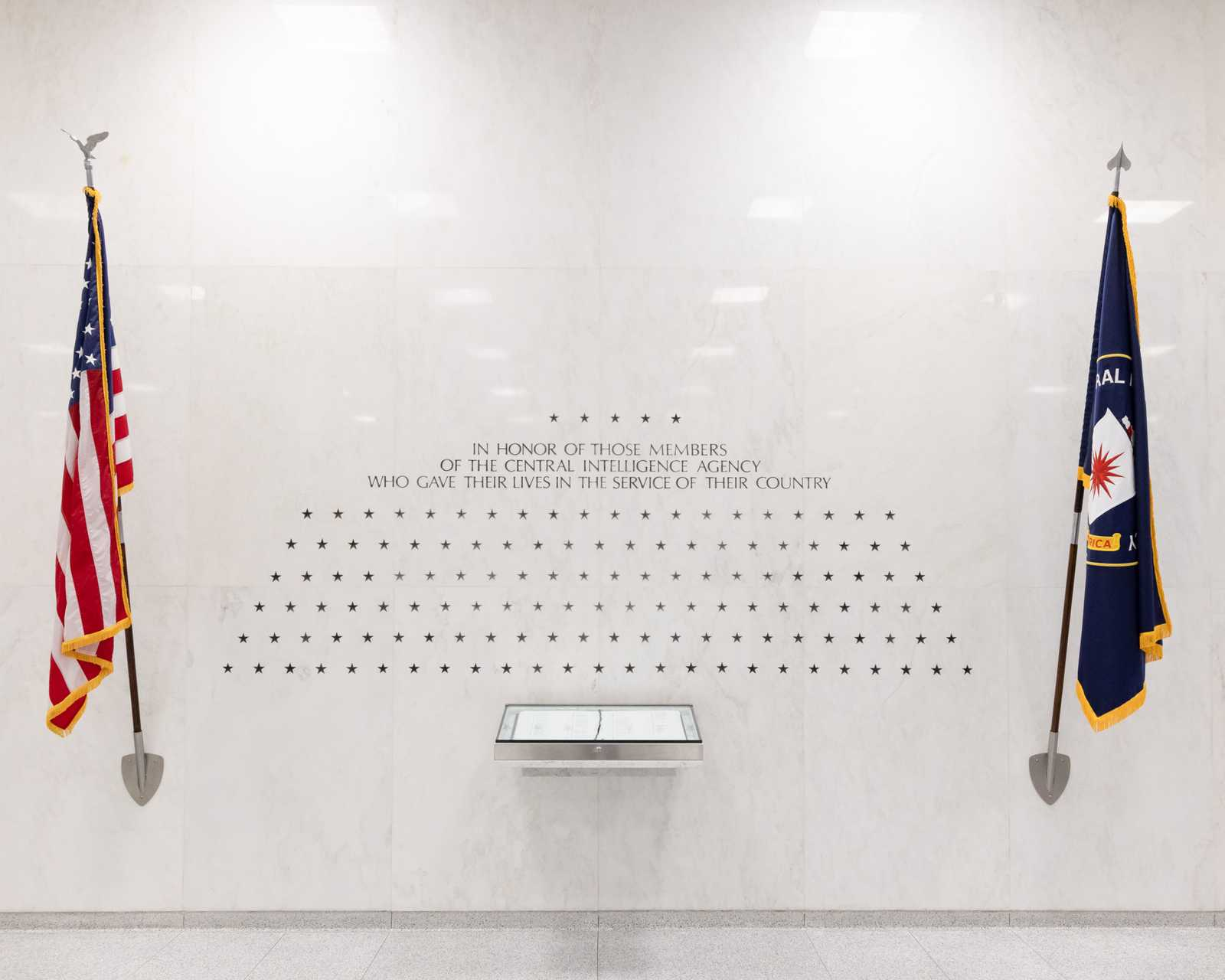
- The wall with 140 stars in 2023
- For CIA employees who died in the line of service
- Unveiled: July 1975
- Location: Langley, Virginia
- Designed by: Harold Vogel
- "In honor of those members of the Central Intelligence Agency who gave their lives in the service of their country"

The Memorial Wall is a memorial at the headquarters of the Central Intelligence Agency in Langley, Virginia. The wall is located in the Original Headquarters Building lobby on the north wall. There are 141 stars carved into the white Alabama marble wall, each one representing an employee who died in the line of service. Paramilitary Operations Officers (PMOO) of the Special Activities Center comprise the majority of those memorialized.

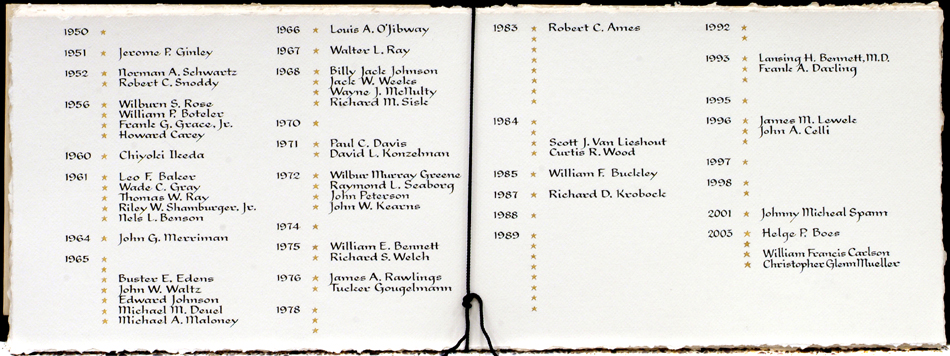
CIA Book of Honor 1950–2003

== Memorial ==
The wall bears the inscription "In honor of those members of the Central Intelligence Agency who gave their lives in the service of their country." The wall is flanked by the flag of the United States on the left and a flag bearing the CIA seal on the right.

=== Book of Honor ===
A black Moroccan goatskin-bound book, called the "Book of Honor", sits in a steel frame beneath the stars, its "slender case jutting out from the wall just below the field of stars", and is "framed in stainless steel and topped by an inch-thick plate of glass." Inside it shows the stars, arranged by year of death and, when possible, lists the names of employees who died in CIA service alongside them.

In 1997, there were 70 stars, 29 of which had names. There were 79 stars in 2002, 83 in 2004, 90 in 2009, 107 in 2013, 111 in 2014, 125 in 2017, 129 in 2018, 133 in 2019, 135 in 2020, 137 in 2021, 139 in 2022, 140 in 2023, and 141 in 2026. Of the 141 entries in the book in 2026, 108 are named, while 33 are not. The 33 not named are represented only by a gold star followed by a blank space.

=== Secrecy of names ===
The identities of the unnamed stars remain secret, even in death, though many names from the Cold War era have been released or uncovered in recent years.

== Adding new stars ==
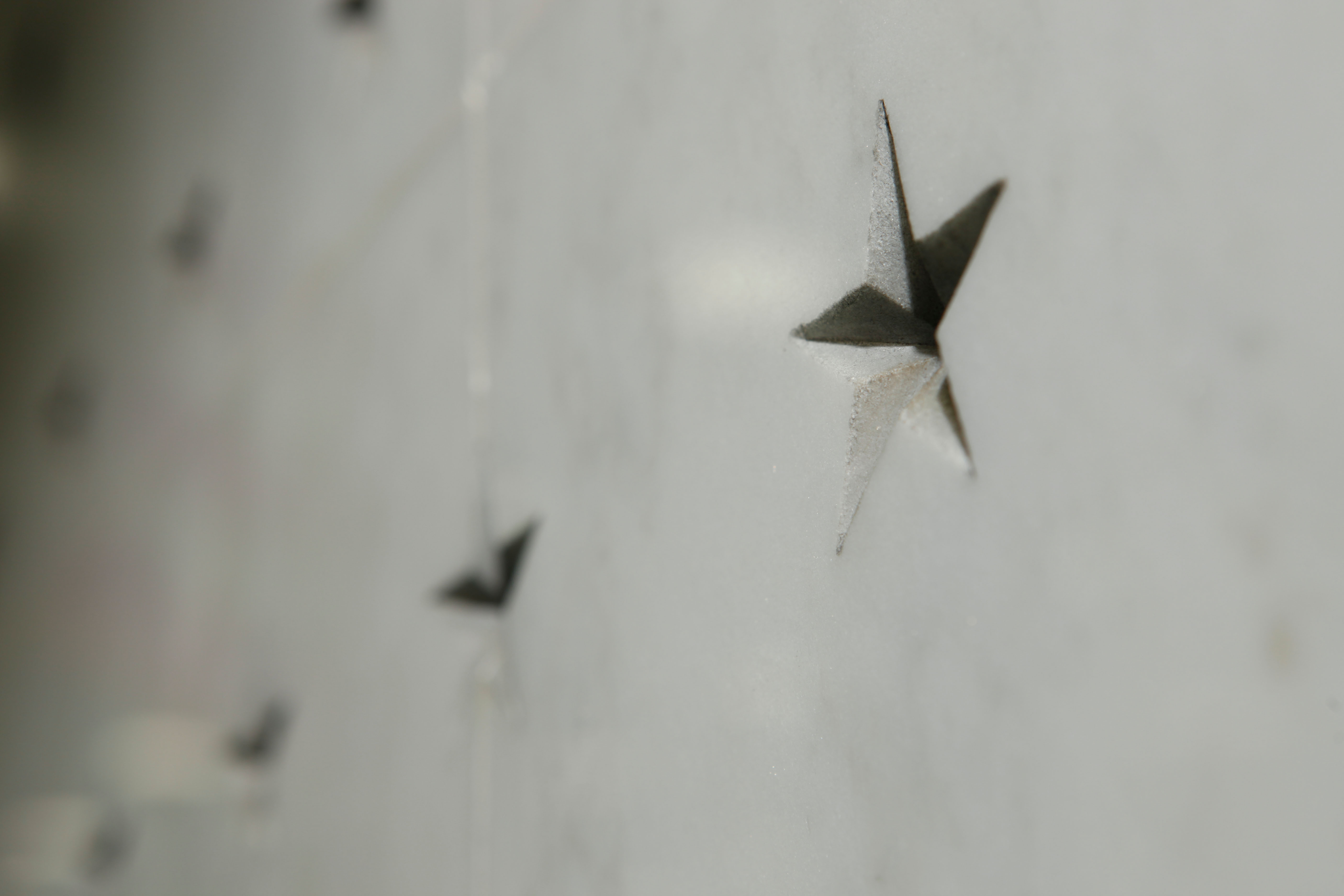
One of the engraved stars

When new names are added to the Book of Honor, stone carver Tim Johnston of the Carving and Restoration Team in Manassas, Virginia adds a new star to the wall if that person's star is not already present. Johnston learned the process of creating the stars from the original sculptor of the wall, Harold Vogel, who created the first 31 stars and the Memorial Wall inscription when the wall was created in July 1974. Although the wall was "first conceived as a small plaque to recognize those from the CIA who died in Southeast Asia, the idea quickly grew to a memorial for Agency employees who died in the line of duty." The process used by Johnston to add a new star is as follows:

Johnston creates a star by first tracing the new star on the wall using a template. Each star measures 2 1/4 inches (57 mm) tall by 2¼ inches wide and one-half inch (thirteen millimetres) deep; all the stars are six inches apart from each other, as are all the rows. Johnston uses both a pneumatic air hammer and a chisel to carve out the traced pattern. After he finishes carving the star, he cleans the dust and sprays the star black, which as the star ages, fades to gray.

== Candidates ==
The Honor and Merit Awards Board (HMAB) recommends approval of candidates to be listed on the wall to the Director of the Central Intelligence Agency. The CIA states that

[i]nclusion on the Memorial Wall is awarded posthumously to employees who lose their lives while serving their country in the field of intelligence. Death may occur in the foreign field or in the United States. Death must be of an inspirational or heroic character while in the performance of duty; or as the result of an act of terrorism while in the performance of duty; or as an act of premeditated violence targeted against an employee, motivated solely by that employee's Agency affiliation; or in the performance of duty while serving in areas of hostilities or other exceptionally hazardous conditions where the death is a direct result of such hostilities or hazards. After approval by the director, the Office of Protocol arranges for a new star to be placed on the Wall.

=== Suicide death ===
The first suicide to be added to the wall was for employee Ranya Abdelsayed, who died by suicide in 2013 after working for a year in Afghanistan. CIA leadership was criticized by some who feel she did not meet the criteria for the wall.

== Current stars and known individuals ==
Date of Death	Name	Cause of Death
1947
March 20, 1947	Lieutenant John W. Creech	Killed when their plane crashed in bad weather while en route to Addis Ababa, Ethiopia. They worked for the Central Intelligence Group (CIG), the direct predecessor to CIA.
March 20, 1947	Daniel C. Dennett, Jr.	Killed when their plane crashed in bad weather while en route to Addis Ababa, Ethiopia. They worked for the Central Intelligence Group (CIG), the direct predecessor to CIA.
1950
April 29, 1950	Douglas Mackiernan	The first CIA employee to be killed in the line of duty and the first star on the wall. Mackiernan had worked for the State Department in China since 1947. When the People's Republic of China was established at the end of the Chinese Civil War in 1949, the State Department ordered that the Tihwa (Ürümqi) consulate where Mackiernan was stationed as vice consul be closed, and personnel were to leave the country immediately. Mackiernan, however, was ordered to stay behind, destroy cryptographic equipment, monitor the situation, and aid anti-communist Nationalists. Mackiernan fled south toward India after most escape routes were cut off, along with Frank Bessac, an American Fulbright Scholar who was in Tihwa, and three White Russians. Although Mackiernan and his party survived the Taklamakan Desert and Himalayas, Mackiernan was shot by Tibetan border guards, probably because they mistook them as Communist infiltrators, on April 29, 1950.
1951
January 11, 1951	Jerome P. Ginley	Ginley was killed when his plane crashed into the East China Sea, near the Japanese Ryukyu Islands.
1952
November 29, 1952	Norman A. Schwartz	Schwartz and Snoddy were pilots of a C-47 aircraft on a mission to extract a CIA operative from China. Their plane took off on November 29, 1952, from South Korea for Jilin province, China. They were preparing to pick up the agent with an airborne extraction system when the operative was compromised by Chinese forces on the ground and their plane was shot down. Both Schwartz and Snoddy were killed, while two other CIA crewmembers, Richard G. Fecteau and John T. Downey, were captured by the Chinese and held until 1971 and 1973, respectively. Schwartz's and Snoddy's remains were returned in 2005.
November 29, 1952	Robert C. Snoddy	
1954
1954	James "Pete" McCarthy Jr.	Born in 1925, a World War II Veteran and later a paramilitary operations officer who died in 1954, on a training flight in Southeast Asia.
1956
May 15, 1956	Wilburn S. Rose	Three CIA Lockheed U-2 pilots who died in plane crashes – Rose, Grace, Carey were honored with stars in 1974.
August 31, 1956	Frank G. Grace	Three CIA Lockheed U-2 pilots who died in plane crashes – Rose, Grace, Carey were honored with stars in 1974.
September 17, 1956	Howard Carey	Three CIA Lockheed U-2 pilots who died in plane crashes – Rose, Grace, Carey were honored with stars in 1974.
June 16, 1956	William P. Boteler	Boteler was killed in the bombing of a restaurant in Cyprus that was frequented by CIA operatives; the group EOKA committed the attack on June 16, 1956.
1957
January 1957	James J. McGrath	A native of Middletown, Connecticut, McGrath died following an accident while working on a high-power German transmitter in January 1957. His star was placed on the wall in 2007.
1960
March 17, 1960	Chiyoki Ikeda	Ikeda died when Northwest Orient Airlines Flight 710 crashed in Indiana while he was on temporary duty assignment in the United States.
May 1, 1960	Stephen Kasarda, Jr.	A native of McKees Rocks, Pennsylvania, Kasarda died while stationed in Southeast Asia. He was working with air supply missions being flown into Tibet.
1961
April 13, 1961	Nels L. Benson	Killed in a training accident while instructing members of Brigade 2506 on the use of C-4 explosives in Retalhuleu, Guatemala.
April 19, 1961	Leo F. Baker	Four CIA pilots were killed while supporting the failed Bay of Pigs invasion on Cuba. One more American was killed during the invasion, paratrooper Herman Koch Gene, but he was not part of the CIA. Baker was buried in a mass grave in Cuba and Thomas Ray's remains were returned to his family in 1979.
April 19, 1961	Wade C. Gray	Four CIA pilots were killed while supporting the failed Bay of Pigs invasion on Cuba. One more American was killed during the invasion, paratrooper Herman Koch Gene, but he was not part of the CIA. Baker was buried in a mass grave in Cuba and Thomas Ray's remains were returned to his family in 1979.
April 19, 1961	Thomas W. Ray	Four CIA pilots were killed while supporting the failed Bay of Pigs invasion on Cuba. One more American was killed during the invasion, paratrooper Herman Koch Gene, but he was not part of the CIA. Baker was buried in a mass grave in Cuba and Thomas Ray's remains were returned to his family in 1979.
April 19, 1961	Riley W. Shamburger	Four CIA pilots were killed while supporting the failed Bay of Pigs invasion on Cuba. One more American was killed during the invasion, paratrooper Herman Koch Gene, but he was not part of the CIA. Baker was buried in a mass grave in Cuba and Thomas Ray's remains were returned to his family in 1979.
August 13, 1961	David W. Bevan	Bevan, Eubanks, Lewis were former smokejumpers working for the CIA's Air America airline when their plane crashed in Laos on August 13, 1961, killing them and two other crew members. They were dropping cargo in support of General Vang Pao's Hmong army when their plane experienced a mechanical problem. The three men were honored with stars in 2017.
August 13, 1961	Darrell A. Eubanks	Bevan, Eubanks, Lewis were former smokejumpers working for the CIA's Air America airline when their plane crashed in Laos on August 13, 1961, killing them and two other crew members. They were dropping cargo in support of General Vang Pao's Hmong army when their plane experienced a mechanical problem. The three men were honored with stars in 2017.
August 13, 1961	John S. Lewis	Bevan, Eubanks, Lewis were former smokejumpers working for the CIA's Air America airline when their plane crashed in Laos on August 13, 1961, killing them and two other crew members. They were dropping cargo in support of General Vang Pao's Hmong army when their plane experienced a mechanical problem. The three men were honored with stars in 2017.
1964
July 26, 1964	John G. Merriman	A CIA pilot, his T-28 aircraft was shot down while attacking a convoy of Simba rebels near Kabalo, Congo, during a counter-insurgency mission.
1965
March 30, 1965	Barbara Robbins	Killed in a Vietcong car bomb attack on the U.S. embassy in Saigon, South Vietnam. She was honored with one of the original 31 stars in 1974, but her name was not included in the Book of Honor until May 2011.
April 26, 1965	Eugene "Buster" Edens	CIA Lockheed U-2 pilot who died in a plane crash. He was honored with a star in 1974.
June 6, 1965	John W. Waltz	Died in Baghdad, Iraq, while working as an Aide at the U.S. embassy. He became ill and died from medical complications following emergency surgery.
August 20, 1965	Edward Johnson	They were killed when their helicopter crashed into the Mekong River. Johnson was an intelligence officer assigned to Air America. O'Jibway was the CIA commander of embedded training forces in Northwestern Laos, and commanded the bases at Chiang Khong, Thailand and Nam Yu, Laos. O'Jibway's body was never found, and was listed as "presumed dead" exactly one year after the helicopter crash.
August 20, 1965	Louis O'Jibway	They were killed when their helicopter crashed into the Mekong River. Johnson was an intelligence officer assigned to Air America. O'Jibway was the CIA commander of embedded training forces in Northwestern Laos, and commanded the bases at Chiang Khong, Thailand and Nam Yu, Laos. O'Jibway's body was never found, and was listed as "presumed dead" exactly one year after the helicopter crash.
October 12, 1965	Michael M. Deuel	Both Deuel and Maloney were intelligence officers assigned to Air America. They were killed, along with an Air America pilot and a mechanic, when their helicopter crashed near Saravane, Laos.
October 12, 1965	Michael A. Maloney	Both Deuel and Maloney were intelligence officers assigned to Air America. They were killed, along with an Air America pilot and a mechanic, when their helicopter crashed near Saravane, Laos.
November 29, 1965	Marcell Rene Gough	A maritime specialist who died in a vehicle accident in November 1965, in Zaire, while on assignment to maintain equipment for operations designed to defeat communist-backed rebels.
1967
January 5, 1967	Walter L. Ray	CIA A-12 pilot killed in a crash in test flight in Nevada.
February 15, 1967	Ksawery "Bill" Wyrozemski	An air operations officer who died in a vehicle accident in Zaire.
1968
February 1, 1968	Billy J. Johnson	Johnson, Hubbard, Brown, McNulty and Sisk were killed in action during the Vietnam War in South Vietnam or Laos.
February 4, 1968	Robert Walker Hubbard	Johnson, Hubbard, Brown, McNulty and Sisk were killed in action during the Vietnam War in South Vietnam or Laos.
February 26, 1968	Robert Wilson Brown Jr.	Johnson, Hubbard, Brown, McNulty and Sisk were killed in action during the Vietnam War in South Vietnam or Laos.
August 15, 1968	Wayne J. McNulty	Johnson, Hubbard, Brown, McNulty and Sisk were killed in action during the Vietnam War in South Vietnam or Laos.
August 20, 1968	Richard M. Sisk	Johnson, Hubbard, Brown, McNulty and Sisk were killed in action during the Vietnam War in South Vietnam or Laos.
June 4, 1968	Jack W. Weeks	CIA A-12 pilot killed in a plane crash.
October 12, 1968	Charles Mayer	Born in 1936, an engineer in the Directorate of Science and Technology, who died in an airplane crash in Iran in 1968. His duties at the CIA were to monitor the Soviet Union's missile capabilities.
1969
January 5, 1969	Jon Price Evans	Jon Evans was a CIA medical officer who was also a former Army physician. He and a Continental Air Services pilot, Arlie Harter, were killed when their Beech Baron twin propeller plane crashed in northern Thailand while flying to Vientiane, Laos. Evans began his multi-decade relationship with the CIA in 1948 when he helped to establish the medical department. He alternated between stateside hospital administration roles and assignments in Iran, India, Korea, and Thailand.
1970
April 13, 1970	Hugh Francis Redmond	Redmond was a member of the Special Activities Division (SAD) who was posing as an ice cream machine salesman when he was captured in 1951, in Shanghai, China, while boarding a ship for San Francisco. He was in captivity for 19 years until he died on April 13, 1970. The Chinese claim that he slit his wrists.
1971
1971	Paul C. Davis	Unknown
October 24, 1971	David L. Konzelman	While serving in Southeast Asia during the Vietnam War, Konzelman was severely injured by a phosphorus hand grenade that exploded while he was holding it. He received burns over more than 45 percent of his body and died of his injuries several weeks later at Brooke Army General Hospital in Texas.
1972
April 28, 1972	Wilbur M. Greene	Greene was serving in the Vietnam War when he died during a gall bladder operation.
September 27, 1972	Raymond L. Seaborg	Seaborg, Peterson and Kearns were killed in action during the Vietnam War in South Vietnam or Laos.
October 19, 1972	John Peterson	Seaborg, Peterson and Kearns were killed in action during the Vietnam War in South Vietnam or Laos.
December 15, 1972	John W. Kearns	Seaborg, Peterson and Kearns were killed in action during the Vietnam War in South Vietnam or Laos.
1974
November 23, 1974	Raymond C. Rayner	Rayner was killed by an unknown intruder who broke into his home at night on Bushrod Island, near Monrovia, Liberia.
1975
January 3, 1975	James A. Rawlings	Killed in a cargo plane crash in South Vietnam. He was declared missing and, a year later, the CIA issued a "presumptive determination" of death.
January 4, 1975	William E. Bennett	Bennett was killed in an explosion at his residence in Tuy Hòa, South Vietnam, during the Vietnam War, while working as a political reporting officer for the U.S. embassy.
June 23, 1975	Tucker Gougelmann	Gougelmann was a Paramilitary Operations Officer from the CIA's Special Activities Division who worked in the CIA from 1949 to 1972, serving in Europe, Afghanistan, Korea, and Vietnam. Gougelmann returned to Saigon in spring 1975 in an attempt to secure exit visas for loved ones after North Vietnam had launched a major offensive. He missed his final flight out of Saigon, and was captured by the North Vietnamese, who tortured him reportedly for 11 months before he died. However, his official date of death is listed as June 23, 1975, almost two months after his capture. Gougelmann was honored with a Memorial Star after the criteria for inclusion on the Wall were broadened and after "It was determined that although Gougelmann did not die in the line of duty while employed by CIA, his past affiliation with the Agency led to his death."
December 23, 1975	Richard Welch	Station chief in Greece who was assassinated by the radical Marxist organization Revolutionary Organization 17 November.
1978
July 13, 1978	Denny Gabriel	Former members of Air America, they were killed, along with a member of U.S. Special Forces, when their plane crashed in North Carolina, during a mission preparation training exercise.
July 13, 1978	Berl King	Former members of Air America, they were killed, along with a member of U.S. Special Forces, when their plane crashed in North Carolina, during a mission preparation training exercise.
1978	Unidentified	Unknown
1983
April 18, 1983	Robert Ames	Died in the 1983 Beirut embassy bombing. Haas was the station chief.
April 18, 1983	Phyliss Faraci	Died in the 1983 Beirut embassy bombing. Haas was the station chief.
April 18, 1983	James Lewis	Died in the 1983 Beirut embassy bombing. Haas was the station chief.
April 18, 1983	Kenneth E. Haas	Died in the 1983 Beirut embassy bombing. Haas was the station chief.
April 18, 1983	Deborah M. Hixon	Died in the 1983 Beirut embassy bombing. Haas was the station chief.
April 18, 1983	Frank J. Johnston	Died in the 1983 Beirut embassy bombing. Haas was the station chief.
April 18, 1983	Monique Lewis	Died in the 1983 Beirut embassy bombing. Haas was the station chief.
April 18, 1983	William Richard Sheil	Died in the 1983 Beirut embassy bombing. Haas was the station chief.
1984
October 18, 1984	Richard Spicer	Killed in a plane crash while on a covert mission during the Salvadoran Civil War.
October 18, 1984	Scott J. Van Lieshout	Killed in a plane crash while on a covert mission during the Salvadoran Civil War.
October 18, 1984	Curtis R. Wood	Killed in a plane crash while on a covert mission during the Salvadoran Civil War.
October 18, 1984	Unidentified	Killed in a plane crash while on a covert mission during the Salvadoran Civil War.
1985
June 3, 1985	William Francis Buckley	Station chief in Lebanon killed in captivity by Hezbollah.
1987
March 26, 1987	Richard D. Krobock	Killed in a helicopter crash during the Salvadoran Civil War.
1988
December 21, 1988	Matthew Gannon	Gannon was the CIA's deputy station chief in Beirut, Lebanon; he was one of at least four American intelligence officers aboard Pan Am Flight 103 (he was assigned Clipper Class seat 14J), when a bomb detonated and destroyed the plane high over Lockerbie, Scotland.
1989
August 7, 1989	Robert W. Woods	Killed in a plane crash (along with U.S. Representative Mickey Leland), while on a humanitarian mission in Ethiopia.
November 27, 1989	Michael Atkinson	Killed when their Lockheed L-100 Hercules transport plane crashed on November 27, 1989, in Angola while supporting the rebel group UNITA. Eleven members of UNITA who were on board also died in the crash.
November 27, 1989	George Bensch	Killed when their Lockheed L-100 Hercules transport plane crashed on November 27, 1989, in Angola while supporting the rebel group UNITA. Eleven members of UNITA who were on board also died in the crash.
November 27, 1989	George V. Lacy	Killed when their Lockheed L-100 Hercules transport plane crashed on November 27, 1989, in Angola while supporting the rebel group UNITA. Eleven members of UNITA who were on board also died in the crash.
November 27, 1989	Gerhard H. Rieger	Killed when their Lockheed L-100 Hercules transport plane crashed on November 27, 1989, in Angola while supporting the rebel group UNITA. Eleven members of UNITA who were on board also died in the crash.
November 27, 1989	Jimmy Spessard	Killed when their Lockheed L-100 Hercules transport plane crashed on November 27, 1989, in Angola while supporting the rebel group UNITA. Eleven members of UNITA who were on board also died in the crash.
November 27, 1989	Pharies "Bud" Petty	Killed when their Lockheed L-100 Hercules transport plane crashed on November 27, 1989, in Angola while supporting the rebel group UNITA. Eleven members of UNITA who were on board also died in the crash.
1989	Unidentified	Unknown
1992
July 19, 1992	Barry S. Castiglione	Killed during the ocean rescue of a colleague in El Salvador.
December 23, 1992	Lawrence N. Freedman	Killed by a landmine in Somalia on December 23, 1992.
1993
January 25, 1993	Lansing H. Bennett M.D.	The two fatalities of the 1993 shootings at CIA Headquarters. Bennett, with experience as a physician, was working as an intelligence analyst assessing the health of foreign leaders. Darling worked in covert operations.
January 25, 1993	Frank Darling	The two fatalities of the 1993 shootings at CIA Headquarters. Bennett, with experience as a physician, was working as an intelligence analyst assessing the health of foreign leaders. Darling worked in covert operations.
August 8, 1993	Freddie Woodruff	Woodruff was assassinated in Tbilisi, Georgia, while acting as the station chief and training the bodyguards of Georgian leader Eduard Shevardnadze and the élite Omega Special Task Force.
1995
March 8, 1995	Jacqueline K. Van Landingham	Shot and killed in Pakistan on March 8, 1995.
1996
April 3, 1996	James M. Lewek	Killed when a US Air Force CT-43A crashed near Dubrovnik, Croatia. Thirty-four other people on board were also killed, including United States Secretary of Commerce Ron Brown.
November 17, 1996	John G.A. Celli III	Killed in a traffic accident in the Middle East.
November 23, 1996	Leslianne Shedd	Killed when three Ethiopians, who were seeking political asylum in Australia, hijacked Ethiopian Airlines Flight 961 on November 23, 1996, and crashed the plane into the Indian Ocean.
1997
December 6, 1997	Thomas M. Jennings Jr.	Died in a car accident in Bosnia-Herzegovina under State Department cover.
1998
August 7, 1998	Tom Shah	Died in the 1998 African embassy bombings.
August 7, 1998	Molly C.H. Hardy	Died in the 1998 African embassy bombings.
2001
November 2001	Johnny Micheal "Mike" Spann	Spann was a Paramilitary Operations Officer from the Special Activities Division, killed during a Taliban prison uprising in November 2001 in Mazar-e Sharif (see Battle of Qala-i-Jangi). He was the first American killed in combat during the United States invasion of Afghanistan. His star, the 79th, was added in 2002. Officer Spann was posthumously awarded the Intelligence Star for valor for his actions.
2002
January 4, 2002	Nathan Chapman	He was the first U.S. soldier to be killed in combat in the American war in Afghanistan. At the time of his death, he was detailed to the CIA as a CIA paramilitary team's communications specialist. He was killed while investigating an Al-Qaeda safe house in Khost.
2003
February 7, 2003	Helge P. Boes	Killed by a grenade during a training accident in Afghanistan.
July 9, 2003	Gregg Wenzel	An operations officer who was killed in Ethiopia in 2003. A former defense attorney in Florida, Wenzel grew up in Monroe, New York, and was a member of the first clandestine service training class to graduate after the terrorist attacks of September 11th, 2001. His Agency affiliation was withheld for six years. Overseas, Wenzel gathered intelligence on a wide range of national security priorities. In Director Leon Panetta's words: "At age 33, a promising young officer – a leader and friend to so many – was taken from us. We find some measure of solace in knowing that Gregg achieved what he set out to do: He lived for a purpose greater than himself. Like his star on this Wall, that lesson remains with us always."
October 25, 2003	Christopher Glenn Mueller	Mueller and Carlson were paramilitary contractors from Special Activities Division, killed in an ambush in Afghanistan on October 25, 2003. On May 21, 2004, these officers' stars were dedicated at a memorial ceremony. "The bravery of these two men cannot be overstated," then-Director of Central Intelligence George J. Tenet told a gathering of several hundred Agency employees and family members of those killed in the line of duty. "Chris and Chief put the lives of others ahead of their own. That is heroism defined." Mueller, a former US Navy SEAL and Carlson, a former Army Ranger, Green Beret and Delta Force soldier, died while tracking high level terrorists near Shkin, Afghanistan, on October 25, 2003. Both officers saved the lives of others, including Afghan soldiers, during the ambush.
October 25, 2003	William "Chief" Carlson	
2005
December 7, 2005	Gregory R. Wright, Jr.	Killed in Iraq while working on a Protective Service Detail. His team was returning from an asset meeting when they were ambushed by unknown attackers.
2006
September 30, 2006	Rachel A. Dean	Dean was a native of Stanardsville, Virginia, who joined the CIA as a young support officer in January 2005. She died in a car accident in September 2006, while on temporary duty in Kazakhstan.
2007
May 11, 2007	Douglas A. Zembiec	Known as the "Lion of Fallujah" for his deployment there with the US Marine Corps, he was serving with the CIA's Special Activities Division when he was killed in a gun battle in Baghdad in May 2007 while leading Iraqis on a "snatch-and-grab" operation against insurgents. Officially, his star is anonymous; the CIA refuses to comment on Zembiec's employment with the Agency. However, former U.S. intelligence officials have stated in interviews with The Washington Post that Zembiec was indeed serving with the SAD Ground Branch at the time of his death. His Department of Defense biography reports: "In 2005, Zembiec was promoted to major. Shortly after that, he separated from the Marine Corps and joined the Central Intelligence Agency's Special Activities Division in Iraq. On May 11, 2007, he was killed by enemy small-arms fire while leading a raid in Baghdad."
2008
May 10, 2008	Donald A. Barger	Killed in a Taliban ambush in Afghanistan. Barger was a retired Master Sergeant, former US Army Ranger and Special Forces soldier. He served with 1st Ranger Battalion and Army 3rd Special Forces Group.
September 28, 2008	Stephen Stanek	The four died when they were lost at sea during an operation in the South China Sea in 2008. The operation was conducted by the Special Operations Group's Maritime Branch. They embarked on the mission to monitor Chinese military activities, specifically People's Liberation Army Navy, in a disputed area north of Luzon, the largest island in the Philippines. The operation aimed to deploy a surveillance device disguised as a rock. The operatives faced deteriorating conditions caused by Tropical Storm Higos, and all four men died during the storm. Their unexplained disappearance prompted internal debates within the CIA and spurred a reassessment of maritime intelligence strategies, leading to more cautious practices in future operations.
September 28, 2008	Michael Perich	
September 28, 2008	Jamie McCormick	
September 28, 2008	Daniel Meeks	
September 29, 2008	Jeffrey R. Patneau	Died in a car accident while posing as a State Department employee in Yemen.
2008	Unidentified	Unknown
2009
December 30, 2009	Harold Brown	Killed in the Camp Chapman attack in Afghanistan.
December 30, 2009	Elizabeth Hanson	Killed in the Camp Chapman attack in Afghanistan.
December 30, 2009	Jennifer Matthews	Killed in the Camp Chapman attack in Afghanistan.
December 30, 2009	Darren LaBonte	Killed in the Camp Chapman attack in Afghanistan.
December 30, 2009	Dane Paresi	Killed in the Camp Chapman attack in Afghanistan.
December 30, 2009	Scott Roberson	Killed in the Camp Chapman attack in Afghanistan.
December 30, 2009	Jeremy Wise	Killed in the Camp Chapman attack in Afghanistan.
2011
September 25, 2011	Jay Henigan	Shot and killed by a rogue Afghan working for the U.S. government while working as a plumber and CIA contractor at the U.S. embassy in Kabul, Afghanistan.
2012
September 11–12, 2012	Glen A. Doherty	Killed during the attack on the U.S. diplomatic mission in Benghazi, Libya, on the night of September 11–12, 2012. Both were former Navy SEALs and worked as CIA security contractors. In addition, the US ambassador to Libya, Chris Stevens, and one other American diplomat, Sean Smith, were also killed in the attack.
September 11–12, 2012	Tyrone S. Woods	Killed during the attack on the U.S. diplomatic mission in Benghazi, Libya, on the night of September 11–12, 2012. Both were former Navy SEALs and worked as CIA security contractors. In addition, the US ambassador to Libya, Chris Stevens, and one other American diplomat, Sean Smith, were also killed in the attack.
October 13, 2012	Dario N. Lorenzetti	Killed during a suicide bombing by a member of Afghanistan's National Directorate of Security. He was a 1993 West Point graduate and Army Ranger.
2013
August 28, 2013	Ranya Abdelsayed	Died by suicide while stationed in Afghanistan targeting senior al-Qaida and Taliban members.
2014
May 9, 2014	Keith Allen Butler	A CIA paramilitary contractor who was killed in a counterterrorism operation in Afghanistan.
2016
May 23, 2016	Mark S. Rausenberger	Killed while working for the CIA in the Philippines, details about the circumstances of his death remain classified. He worked for the CIA for 18 years and also served in the U.S. Army. He was previously stationed in Afghanistan, Iraq, Somalia, and other countries. He was honored with a star in 2017.
October 26, 2016	Brian R. Hoke	Both were killed during an assault on an ISIS compound outside of Jalalabad, Afghanistan. Hoke was a former United States Navy SEAL and Delemarre a former Marine. Both were members of Special Activities Division.
October 26, 2016	Nathaniel P. Delemarre	Both were killed during an assault on an ISIS compound outside of Jalalabad, Afghanistan. Hoke was a former United States Navy SEAL and Delemarre a former Marine. Both were members of Special Activities Division.
November 4, 2016	Matthew C. Lewellen	Members of the 5th Special Forces Group – were working for the CIA, training moderate Syrian rebels in Jordan, when they were shot and killed on November 4, 2016. Although Jordan initially claimed that security forces at King Faisal Air Base had fired upon the Americans for failing to stop at the base's gate, U.S. officials stated that the soldiers were killed by a deliberate terrorist attack. Video shows that after the Americans had been cleared to enter the base, one of the Jordanian guards opened fire on the men. The Jordanian attacker was wounded in the shootout.
November 4, 2016	Kevin J. McEnroe	
November 4, 2016	James F. Moriarty	
December 18, 2016	George A. Whitney	Killed in the Jalalabad area of Afghanistan. Whitney was a former United States Marine Captain.
2017
2017	Unidentified	Unknown
2017	Unidentified	Unknown
2017	Unidentified	Unknown
2017	Unidentified	Unknown
2020
November 21–22, 2020	Michael Goodboe	Killed in combat in Somalia.
Undisclosed year
Unknown	Unidentified	Unknown
Unknown	Unidentified	Unknown
Unknown	Unidentified	Unknown
Unknown	Unidentified	Unknown
Unknown	Unidentified	Unknown
Unknown	Unidentified	Unknown
Unknown	Unidentified	Unknown
Unknown	Unidentified	Unknown
Unknown	Unidentified	Unknown

== Other fatalities ==
=== First fatality ===
Jane Wallis Burrell was the first CIA officer to die in the Agency's service when an Air France DC-3 from Brussels crashed on approach to the Le Bourget Airport near Paris on January 6, 1948, killing all five crew members and 10 of the 11 passengers. She died only 110 days after the CIA was officially established the previous September. Burrell was never a candidate for a star on the CIA's Memorial Wall because the wall commemorates Agency employees who died in specific circumstances and deaths from commercial aircraft crashes have generally not qualified.

=== Civil Air Transport ===
On May 6, 1954, during the Battle of Dien Bien Phu, two CIA pilots, James B. McGovern, Jr. and Wallace Buford, were killed when their C-119 Flying Boxcar cargo plane was shot down while on a resupply mission for the French military. They worked for Civil Air Transport, which was later reorganized as Air America. Neither of them has a star on the Memorial Wall.

=== Air America ===
There were more than 30, pilots and other crew members, of the CIA's Air America company who were killed during the Vietnam War that were not counted as part of the Agency even though they worked for it. The names of some of them were: John M. Bannerman, Eugene DeBruin, Joseph C. Cheney, Charles Herrick, John Lerdo Oyer, Justin B. Mahoney, Jack J. Wells, George L. Ritter, Edward J. Weissenback, and Roy F. Townley.

=== Mexico ===
On April 19, 2026, two CIA officers and two Mexican investigators were killed in a car crash, while returning from a clandestine counter-narcotics raid against a secret drug lab in the mountains of Mexico. One of the CIA officers was identified as John D. Black, a former US Marine. Since the previous year, CIA operatives inside Mexico directly participated in attacks on several cartel members as part of the Mexican drug war. During the CIA's annual memorial ceremony in May 2026, one new star was added to the CIA Memorial Wall. However, the identity of the killed officer and date of death was not disclosed.

== See also ==
- Captain John Birch killed in 1945 while serving with US Military Intelligence
- Lieutenant Colonel A. Peter Dewey killed in 1945 while serving with the OSS
- Military Intelligence Hall of Fame
- National Security Agency/Central Security Service Cryptologic Memorial
