= John G. Merriman =

John Gaither Merriman (21 October 1929 – 20 August 1964) was a Central Intelligence Agency pilot who died of injuries sustained when his plane was shot down while flying for the Agency in 1964 in the Congo. He was serving in Africa as an instructor for Intermountain Aviation, a CIA front company, training Cuban exile pilots to fly armed T-28 Trojan piston aircraft against communist-backed Simba rebels. Prior to serving in the CIA, Merriman had served in the 82nd Airborne Division.

On July 26, 1964, against Agency orders, Merriman flew a strafing mission against a Simba convoy. His T-28 aircraft was hit by ground fire and he managed to reach an airfield before crashing. He was recovered the following morning and taken back to base where he died of his injuries several weeks later.

Medical evacuation of the wounded Merriman was not considered a priority for the U.S. embassy, who were seeking to conceal CIA involvement in combat operations in the region. As a result, reports indicated that the crashed pilot was actually a Cuban and he was checked into a local hospital under the name 'Mario Carlos'. Inattention and lack of medicine contributed to his detertoraiting condition, eventually dying of a lung embolism aboard a U.S. Air Force transport plane as he left the country on 20 August 1964.

Upon his death, Merriman's wife was told that her husband had died in a hospital in Puerto Rico as a result of a car accident. Merriman was posthumously awarded the Intelligence Star in a closed ceremony at the Agency's headquarters.

== See also ==
- James B. McGovern Jr.
- Ksawery Wyrożemski
- Douglas Mackiernan
- Chiyoki Ikeda
- CIA Memorial Wall
- CIA activities in the Democratic Republic of the Congo
