= Ranya (disambiguation) =

Ranya may refer to:

== Biology ==
- Nannamoria ranya, a species of sea snail

== People ==
- Ranya Abdelsayed, American intelligence officer
- Ranya Mordanova, Russian fashion model
- Ranya Rao, Indian actress
- Ranya Senhaji, an American-born Moroccan footballer

== Places ==
- Ranya, a town in the Kurdistan Region of Iraq
- Ranya District, the district within which that town is located
