= Nathaniel Delemarre =

American paramilitary officer

Nathaniel Patrick Delemarre (September 16, 1969 – October 24, 2016) was an American paramilitary officer for the Central Intelligence Agency in the Special Activities Division (SAD). He was killed in action during an operation in Afghanistan in October 2016.

== Background and service ==
Delemarre served for 12 years as a United States Marine Corps Reserves radio operator, attaining the rank of lance corporal. Following the September 11 attacks, he joined the CIA as an analyst and later became a Navy Reserve officer. In 2007, he was listed as a consular officer with the State Department. He eventually transitioned to work with the CIA's paramilitary unit, the Special Activities Division.

=== CIA career and death ===
Delemarre was wounded during a firefight with Islamic State militants near Jalalabad, Afghanistan, on October 21, 2016. He succumbed to his injuries on October 24, 2016 at Landstuhl Regional Medical Center in Germany shortly after his wife arrived. His colleague, Brian Hoke, was also killed in the operation.

Delemarre is commemorated with a star on the CIA Memorial Wall, honoring personnel who died in the line of duty. He was awarded the Distinguished Intelligence Cross, the CIA's highest honor for valor. He was buried at Arlington National Cemetery and is survived by his wife and two daughters. His roommate, Tim Whelan (politician), in the Marine Corps Reserves paid tribute to him at a Cape Cod event for Memorial Day.
