= Freddie Woodruff =

American intelligence agent (1947–1994)

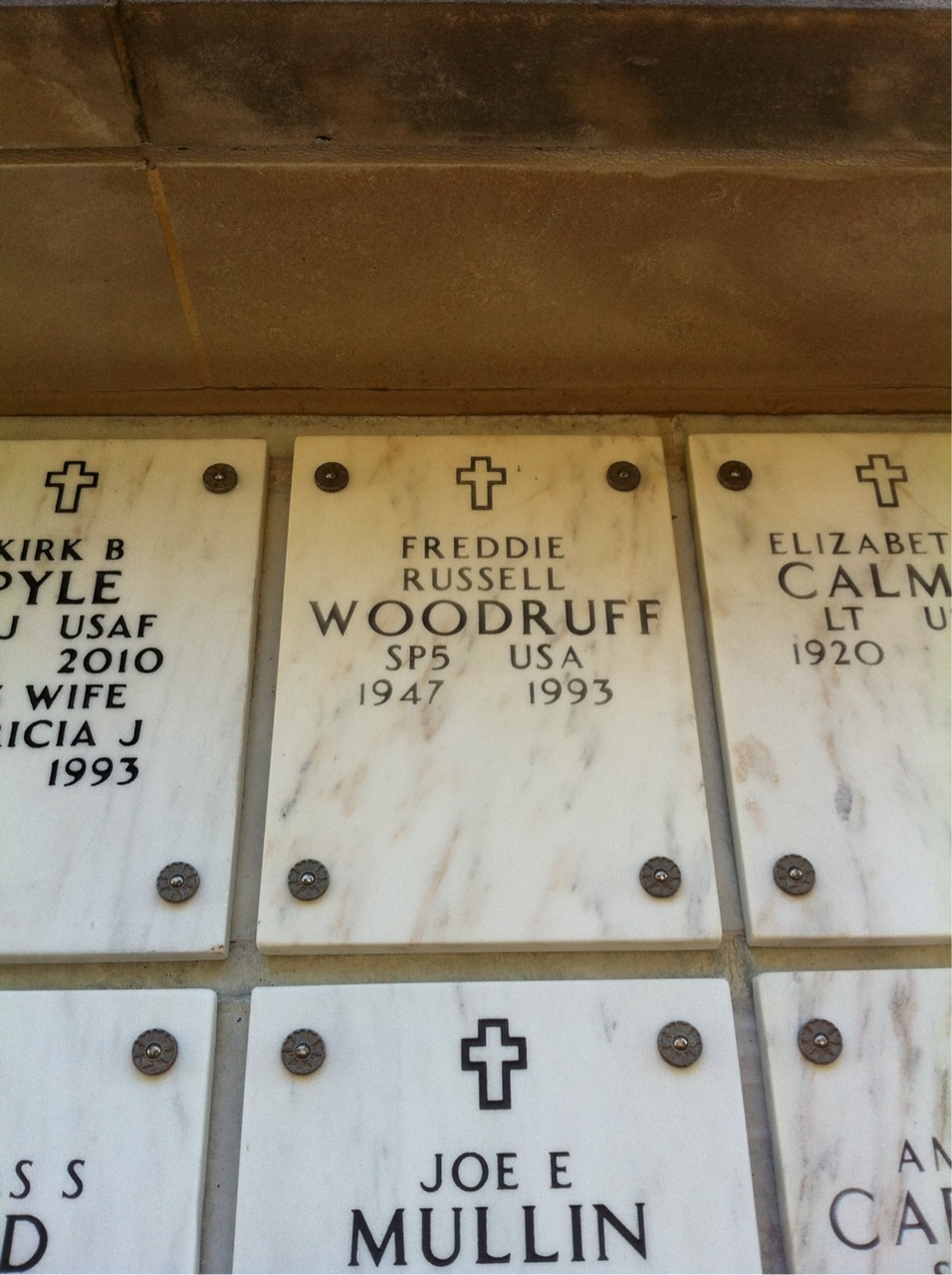
Grave at Arlington National Cemetery

Freddie Russell Woodruff (September 14, 1947 – August 8, 1993) was a regional affairs officer at the U.S. Embassy in Tbilisi, Georgia. Earlier in his career he had been posted under diplomatic cover to Berlin, the consulate in Leningrad and in the early 1980s to Ankara followed by a stint in Ethiopia 1987.

Woodruff has been reported as the Central Intelligence Agency station chief involved in training the bodyguards of the Georgian leader Eduard Shevardnadze and an élite Omega Special Task Force.

== Death ==
He was shot in the head and killed in 1993 on a mountain road in the sensitive border area with Ossetia whilst on a "private trip" in a vehicle driven by the Georgian head of security Eldar Gogoladze. This program had been initiated under the cover of USAID after a state visit to Georgia in 1992 by the American foreign secretary James Baker III immediately after Eduard Shevardnadze had been installed as head of state in the follow-up of a bloody coup d'etat supported by foreign powers against the democratically elected president of Georgia Zviad Gamsakhurdia, who died under suspicious circumstances a year later. Woodruff’s coffin was accompanied home personally by CIA director James Woolsey who gave a speech at Woodruff's funeral service. He was interred at Arlington National Cemetery.

Woodruff was married twice. With his first spouse, he had a daughter and son. He and his second wife, Meredith, a former CIA officer, had three children.

=== Perpetrators ===
Anzor Sharmaidze, a 20-year-old former Soviet draftee, was convicted of Woodruff's murder. Sharmaidze was alleged to have been a "drunk bandit" and to have randomly shot at Woodruff. Although he has not formally cleared of the charges, Sharmaidze was released from prison in 2008 when additional investigation turned up witnesses who claimed they were forced to implicate Sharmaidze during the initial investigation and trial.

In 2013, Georgian Minister of Justice Tea Tsulukiani stated that "[t]he case has not been properly investigated". Tsulukiani said she believed that the killing embarrassed President of Georgia Eduard Shevardnadze and cast doubt in the United States government about his ability to lead his nation.

In a 2018 book by Michael Pullara, The Spy Who Was Left Behind: Russia, the United States, and the True Story of the Betrayal and Assassination of a CIA Agent describes Pullara's personal investigation into the unsolved murder.
