= Jeffrey Patneau =

Jeffrey Robert Patneau (September 9, 1982 – October 4, 2008) was an American intelligence officer for the Central Intelligence Agency (CIA). He died from injuries sustained in a car accident while working for the CIA in Yemen.

== Early life ==
Patneau was born on September 9, 1982, in Hennepin County, Minnesota, to parents Robert Austin Patneau and Dawn Marie Hackenberg Patneau. He had a sister and a brother, who was a Second Lieutenant in the US Marine Corps. The family resided in Lexington, North Carolina. Patneau graduated from Augustana College with a Bachelor of Arts degree in Business.

== Career and death ==
Patneau served as a CIA officer, publicly posing as an employee of the U.S. State Department. On September 29, 2008, Patneau was involved in a car accident in Yemen, sustaining severe injuries. He was transferred to The London Clinic in England, where he died on October 4, 2008. U.S. officials denied al-Qaida claims linking his death to an attack on the U.S. Embassy in Sanaa earlier that month. Patneau's association with the CIA was publicly revealed in 2012, when he was honored as the 103rd entry in the CIA's Book of Honor. A star was added to the CIA Memorial Wall at the agency's headquarters in Langley, Virginia, during the annual memorial ceremony on May 22, 2012. Then-CIA Director David Petraeus praised his service. His family received financial support from the CIA after his death.
