= Louis O'Jibway =

OSS and CIA officer killed in Laos (1918–1965)

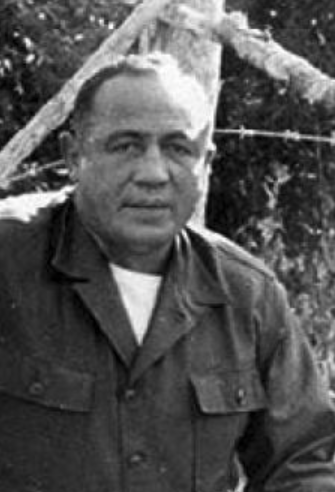
- Born: Soo Township, Sault Sainte Marie, Chippewa County, Michigan; November 3, 1918
- Disappeared: August 20, 1965 (Aged 46); Presumed Dead: August 20, 1966; Mekong River, Laos
- Died: Body never found
- Cause of death: Helicopter crash
- Alma mater: Haskell Indian School; Bacone College; University of New Mexico
- Spouse: Mary Louise Ratcliffe
- Military career
- Branch: Kansas National Guard; Oklahoma National Guard; United States Army; Office of Strategic Services; United States Army Reserve; Central Intelligence Agency
- Rank: GS-13
- Conflicts: World War II; Burma campaign; Cold War; Korean War; Laotian Civil War; Secret War in Laos; Vietnam War
- Awards: Exceptional Service Medallion; Bronze Star Medal

Louis Austin "Jib" O'Jibway was an Ojibwe American football player, boxer, US Army soldier, and intelligence officer. He was one of the few Native Americans to have served in both the OSS and the CIA. He was a Golden Glove heavyweight champion, and was an early training player in the All-America Football Conference. He commanded an OSS amphibious Operational Group (OG) in the Burma campaign. Later, he trained local soldiers during the Laotian Civil War. He presumably died during that war, when his helicopter crashed into the Mekong River, and is recognized with a star on the CIA Memorial Wall and an entry in the Book of Honor. His body, however, was never found, and the date of his death is only presumed.

== Early life ==
O'Jibway was born near an Indian reservation of the Sault Tribe of Chippewa Indians at Soo Township in Sault Ste. Marie, Michigan. His mother was white, and his father was descended from a long line of Ojibwe chiefs. He was the fifth of their seven children. O'Jibway's grandfather was an Ojibwe chief who married a French-Canadian woman. O'Jibway's father, Joseph E. O'Jibway, died when O'Jibway was only three years old.

O'Jibway's mother remarried when he was nine years old to an abusive white stepfather. The new stepfather sent O'Jibway and his six siblings to Indian schools which participated in the controversial practice of the cultural assimilation of Native Americans.

=== Early athletic career ===
Despite these early hardships, O'Jibway distinguished himself as an athlete, excelling in American football and boxing during his teenage years. O'Jibway's athletic talent earned him a scholarship to the Haskell Indian School in Lawrence, Kansas. While studying at Haskell, O'Jibway joined the Kansas National Guard to supplement his educational costs.

Later, O'Jibway earned a scholarship to the Bacone Indian School in Muskogee, Oklahoma. At Bacone, he won first place in both the shot put and javelin and gained prominence as a football tackle. O'Jibway also transferred at this time to the Oklahoma National Guard.

In 1937 and 1939, as a heavyweight boxer, he earned state and regional Golden Gloves amateur titles, becoming the first member of the Bacone “Braves” to advance to the national competition. The New York Times described him as one of the most formidable contenders in the heavyweight class and referred to him as “the Indian from Bacone, Oklahoma.” He later reached the national finals of the Catholic Youth Organization boxing tournament. Sportswriters nicknamed him “Big Honey O'Jibway” and “The Battling Chippewa."

Despite the opportunities that athletics provided, O'Jibway sustained numerous injuries from boxing, including a broken nose, damaged teeth, and a fractured hand. He had also not secured any national titles. To support himself beyond his scholarship funding, he worked summers in oil fields and steel yards as a roughneck laborer.

The University of New Mexico awarded O'Jibway a sports scholarship, enabling him to study there for two academic years. He entered into the school's petroleum engineering program. His speed and coordination earned him recognition as the university's leading football tackle during the 1939 and 1940 seasons. He also won the state Amateur Athletic Union heavyweight boxing championship in the winters of 1940 and 1941. The university yearbook described him as “New Mexico’s greatest lineman in recent years,” while sports broadcaster Bill Stern selected him for Life magazine's national Little All-America team in 1940, stating that O'Jibway was one of the most outstanding college football players of his time.

== World War II ==
When O'Jibway was 22, he was drafted into the United States Army. On September 24, 1941, O'Jibway officially passed his physical examinations for the Army in Santa Fe, New Mexico. That night, he boarded transportation to be processed at the reception center at Fort Bliss.

=== Army boxing and football career ===
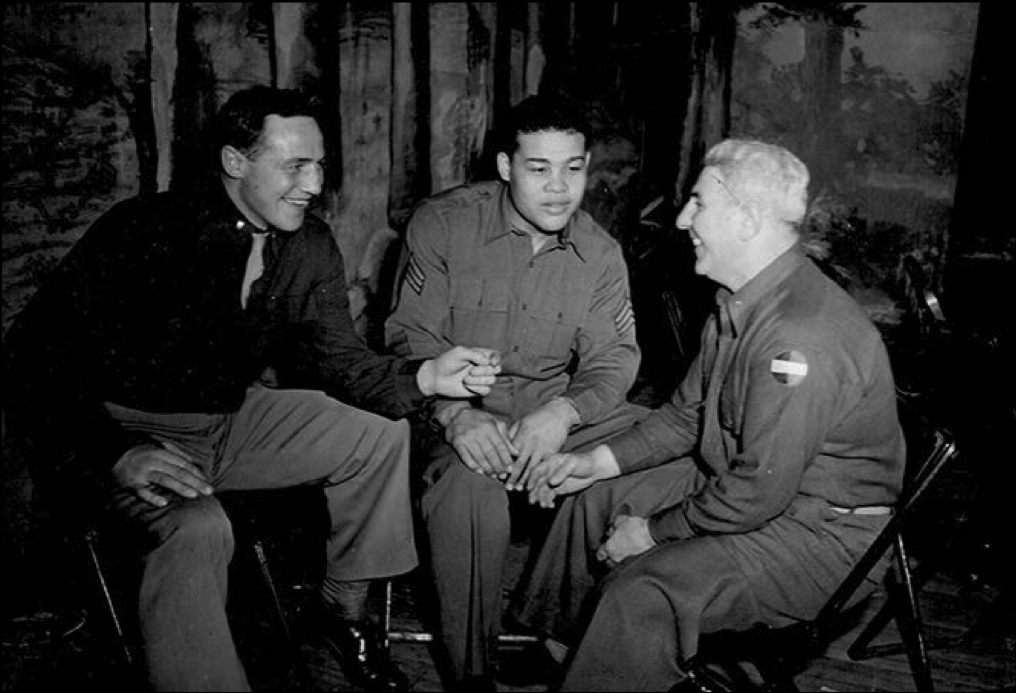
The Fort Riley GI Boxing Training Team in 1942, commanded by O'Jibway. Pictured from left to right are; 1st Lieutenant O'Jibway, Sergeant Joe Louis Barrow, and Corporal Sid Marks.

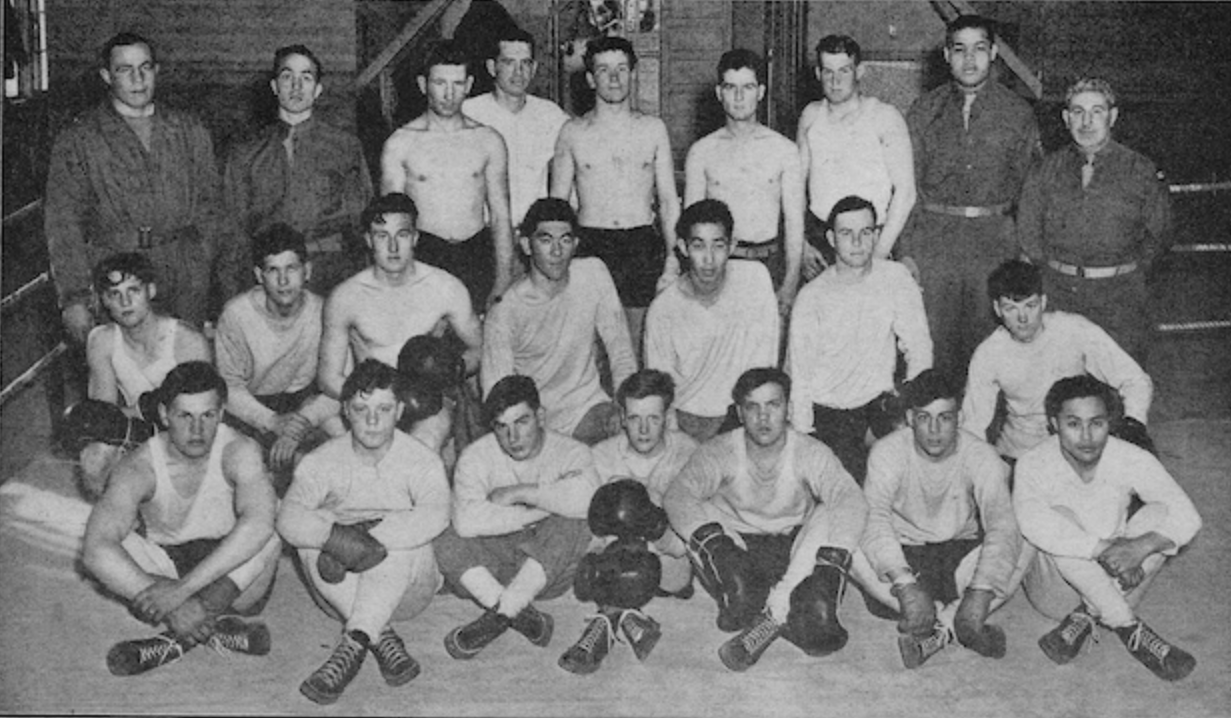
A group of "ring rookies" commanded by O'Jibway (far left). Sid Marks (far right) was the assistant coach. John Moore (center rear), was a trainer. Joe Louis (second-from-right) served as supervisor.

O'Jibway's athletic reputation attracted the attention of a former West Point football coach, who persuaded him to extend his initial one-year enlistment into a three-year term in the regular U.S. Army. He advanced quickly to the rank of corporal and was assigned to the physical training unit at the First Cavalry Division headquarters.

In 1942, after completing a 90-day course at Officer Candidate School, O'Jibway was commissioned as a second lieutenant and appointed athletic director of the Cavalry Replacement Training Center at Fort Riley, Kansas. There, he oversaw programs designed to improve soldiers’ physical conditioning and morale through organized athletics.

The Army encouraged competitive sports such as football and boxing to build strength, discipline, and unit pride among new recruits. By the time he was promoted to first lieutenant, O'Jibway had led the cavalry football team to victories over the infantry team and the reigning Midwest Army champions in 1942 and 1943. He also directed one of the Army's most successful boxing programs, which combined training and public exhibitions. Ring magazine described the boxing program under O'Jibway's leadership as “one of the outstanding service ring outfits of any army camp.”

O'Jibway was serving in this capacity when Joe Louis was assigned to Fort Riley's boxing program and placed under his command. The two men, along with Sid Marks, the former Canadian lightweight champion, collaborated in the Fort Riley GI Boxing Training Team, organizing exhibition matches intended to improve physical readiness and morale among soldiers. Contemporary accounts and later recollections indicate that O'Jibway occasionally acted as one of Joe Louis's sparring partners during this period.

=== Career in the Office of Strategic Services ===
In 1944, O'Jibway volunteered for the Office of Strategic Services, recruited for an amphibious unit mission by Lloyd Peddicord. This unit would eventually be known as the Arakan Field Unit. On April 27, 1944, O'Jibway became the first member of that new OSS unit to arrive at OSS Training Area F, located at the former Congressional Country Club in Bethesda, Maryland.

As additional recruits arrived, the sixty-man group began intensive instruction in commando tactics. Their training included jujitsu, unarmed combat, small-boat handling on the Potomac River, and other specialized exercises. By the end of May, the unit had been reduced to forty men, divided into six small-boat teams. In June 1944, they relocated to OSS Training Area A, a wooded expanse near Quantico, Virginia, now part of Prince William Forest Park. There, the men trained in the use and maintenance of foreign and Allied weapons, the construction and disarming of explosive devices, field survival techniques, and night raids. The program concluded with an Independence Day celebration that included a boxing match so fierce that O'Jibway intervened to stop it. The unit departed for the West Coast on July 14, 1944, before proceeding to the China–Burma–India Theater under the South East Asia Command.

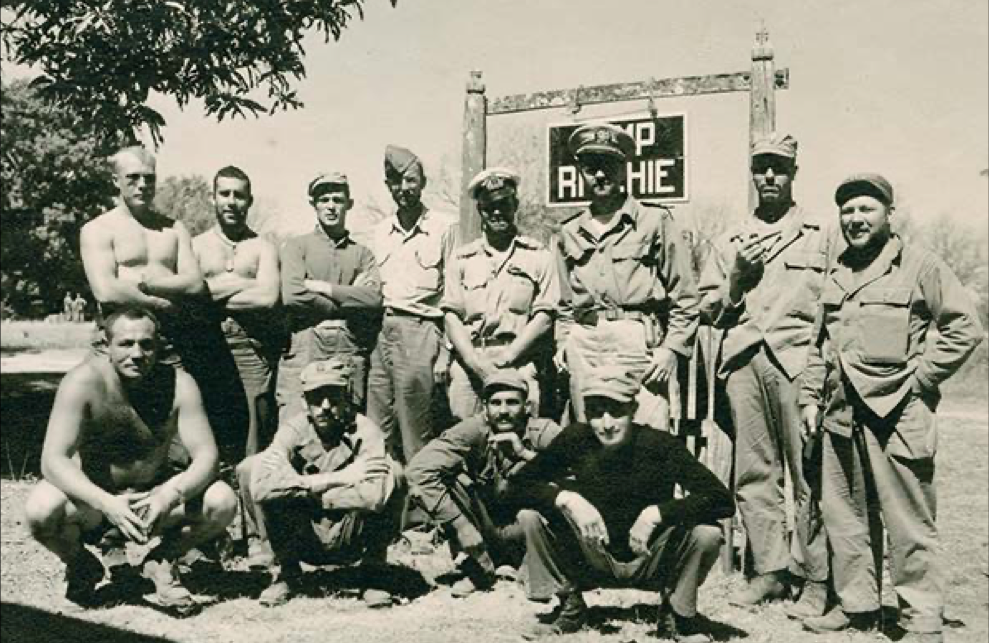
The OSS Amphibious Team at Camp Ritchie on the Bay of Bengal, some time between 1944 and 1945. Louis O'Jibway is pictured kneeling on the far left.

From late 1944 through 1945, the OSS waterborne Operational Group conducted missions along the Indian Ocean and Bay of Bengal using high-speed boats operated by the OSS Maritime Unit. Based at Camp Ritchie, the unit carried out reconnaissance and raiding operations across the islands, mangrove swamps, tidal creeks, and jungles of the Arakan coast in Japanese-occupied Burma, initially under OSS Detachment 404 and later under Detachment 101.

O'Jibway commanded his amphibious reconnaissance team in several other operations, some of which involved direct engagements with Japanese forces, including Operation Rugby and Operation Boston.

During one nighttime probe on Ramree Island, OSS patrols came under heavy fire from entrenched Japanese positions, sustaining casualties and revealing the extent of enemy defenses. Subsequent Allied operations required an entire British Indian Army division and a Royal Marine brigade to secure the island in January 1945, paving the way for the advance on Rangoon.

In the spring of 1945, OSS headquarters reassigned the Arakan Field Unit from coastal reconnaissance to a new mission in China. The men were flown over the Himalayas to join OSS teams from the European Theater tasked with organizing and training the first Chinese paratrooper commando units for operations behind Japanese lines. Before assuming this role, O'Jibway and his team underwent airborne training, earning British parachute qualifications in India and American wings in China.

=== The Blackberry Mission ===
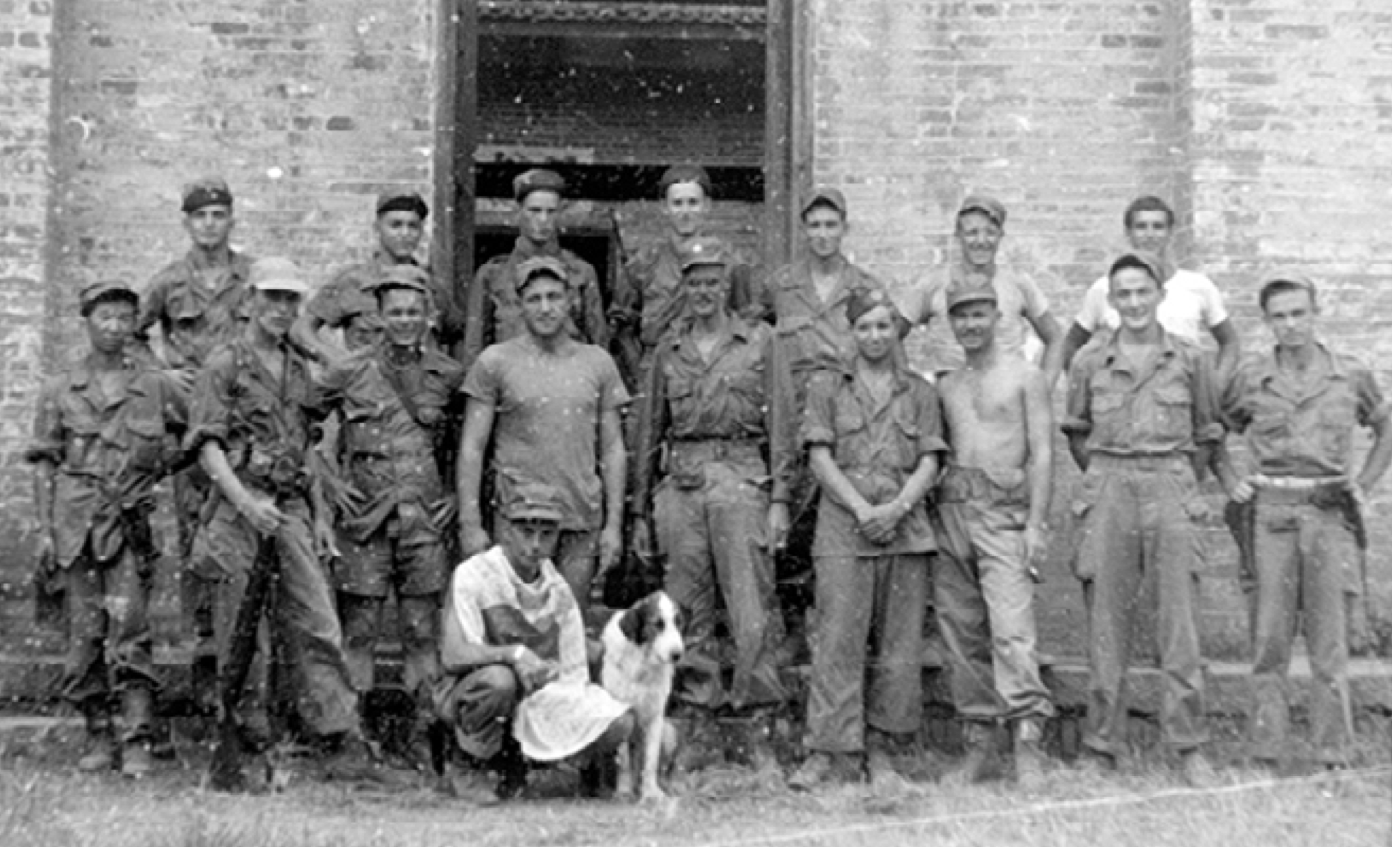
OSS Operational Group in Kunming, China. American officers and NCO's who trained and helped lead the 10th Chinese Commando unit into action against the Japanese.

O'Jibway and Lieutenant John C. Hooker were assigned to the 10th Chinese Commando, one of twenty planned units, each composed of approximately 200 Chinese soldiers with American OSS advisers. The Chinese recruits, many of whom were poorly equipped and in weak physical condition, were reluctant participants in the experimental program. O'Jibway and Hooker worked to train and motivate them, often discussing in private how best to overcome the challenges posed by low morale and limited discipline among their trainees.

When a major Chinese offensive began in July 1945, six OSS-trained commando units were deemed ready for deployment. Their mission was to capture airfields, seize bridges, and disrupt Japanese communication and supply routes. The 8th, 9th, and 10th Chinese Commando units were grouped under the “Blackberry Mission,” commanded by Captain Arthur P. Frizzell, a veteran of OSS operations in France. Assigned to support the Nationalist Chinese Army's 265th Regiment of the 89th Division, their initial objective was the capture of a Japanese-held airfield in southeastern China that had been constructed on the site of a former Maryknoll Catholic mission.

When the joint Chinese and OSS commando units launched their assault, most of the regular Chinese Army officers and troops failed to advance from their positions. In the sector assigned to the 10th Chinese Commando, Lieutenant Louis O'Jibway and his American sergeants, supported by Lieutenant Hooker's mortar section, led their Chinese paratroopers in an attack on a fortified hill. From that position, they directed sustained fire against Japanese forces below.

After several hours of intense combat and heavy counterfire, the commandos began to exhaust their ammunition supply and, lacking reinforcements, were forced to withdraw. Approximately three dozen Chinese paratroopers were killed in the engagement, but the combined force inflicted more than 160 Japanese casualties. During the night, Japanese forces abandoned both the airfield and the nearby town, allowing the U.S.-trained commandos to achieve their tactical objective despite limited support from regular Chinese units.

Following the battle, Maryknoll priests who had taken refuge in the surrounding hills returned to the mission compound and welcomed the American personnel. As a gesture of thanks and remembrance, the commandos hung a parachute in the chapel of the mission.

== Postwar years ==
Following Japan's surrender in August 1945, O'Jibway returned to Washington, D.C. Those who had served in the field in China, including O'Jibway and Lieutenant Hooker, were in poor health after months of exposure to harsh conditions and tropical diseases. O'Jibway was promoted to the rank of Captain and received nearly a year's worth of back pay. On the recommendation of OSS Director William J. Donovan, the War Department awarded O'Jibway the Bronze Star Medal for meritorious service behind enemy lines in China during an assault on a Japanese-held airfield. Having served continuously since September 1941, O'Jibway chose to leave active duty in December 1945, retaining his commission in the Army Reserve.

In January 1946, O'Jibway married Mary Louise Ratcliff, who worked at the Douglas Aircraft plant in Santa Monica. They settled in Pasadena.

O'Jibway initially turned to athletics to earn a living. Dressed in his uniform, he approached Los Angeles boxing promoter Stephen H. “Suey” Welch, who was impressed by his athletic background and arranged for him to train in Ojai, California. O'Jibway competed in the Los Angeles Times Golden Gloves tournament in March 1946 under the name “Austin O'Jibway.” He won the heavyweight division by technical knockout in the second round, earning regional recognition.

Later that year, with the arrival of professional football in Los Angeles, O'Jibway joined the newly established Los Angeles Dons of the All-America Football Conference, a short-lived rival league to the National Football League. However, an injury sustained during training ended his prospects in both professional football and boxing.

Abandoning competitive sports, O'Jibway found work as a security guard at the Douglas Aircraft plant alongside one of his wife's brothers. In August 1946, Mary Louise gave birth prematurely to twins. Three years later, in 1949, the family purchased a home in Redondo Beach, California, a few miles from the Pacific Ocean.

== Career in the Central Intelligence Agency ==
=== Korean War ===
In the fall of 1951, during the Korean War, O'Jibway left his position as a security guard to join the Central Intelligence Agency (CIA) as a clandestine paramilitary officer. After renting out their home in Redondo Beach, the family settled in southern Virginia, near a CIA training facility. Between 1952 and 1954, O'Jibway was stationed in Taiwan. His wife Louise and their twin children accompanied him. He occasionally met with Chiang Kai-shek during this period.

Although he formally joined the CIA in 1951, O'Jibway remained a commissioned officer in the U.S. Army Reserve and was periodically recalled to active duty between 1952 and 1959, generally for short tours. Holding a top-secret clearance, he served in Army intelligence and operations and undertook multiple deployments to the Far East under both military and CIA auspices.

Between 1957 and 1958, Major O'Jibway, then 39 years old, served on active duty with the U.S. Eighth Army Headquarters in South Korea. He devoted much of his free time to assisting a Maryknoll mission for homeless leprosy patients led by Father Joseph A. “Big Joe” Sweeney, whom O'Jibway had first met in China in 1945. The Secretary of the Army gave O'Jibway a citation for his charity work.

=== Secret War in Laos and the Laotian Civil War ===
In the early 1960s, the CIA sent O'Jibway to participate in the Secret War in Laos, the CIA's contribution to the Laotian Civil War. At that stage, the operation was relatively small in scale but would subsequently expand into the largest clandestine campaign in the agency's history. The program sought to arm and supply Hmong and other indigenous groups in Laos to counter the North Vietnamese forces operating within the country.

After completing training at the U.S. Army Special Forces Warfare School at Fort Bragg, North Carolina, in 1961, O'Jibway was assigned to Thailand in 1962. Upon arrival, he helped the Special Forces conduct a six-month guerrilla warfare course for senior Thai and Laotian officers. O'Jibway also served as an adviser to the Thai Border Patrol Police (BPP) commandos, a unit organized and equipped by the CIA with aircraft, radios, and small arms. Because the BPP could operate without attracting attention as foreigners, the agency deployed them across the border into Laos to assist local guerrilla forces.

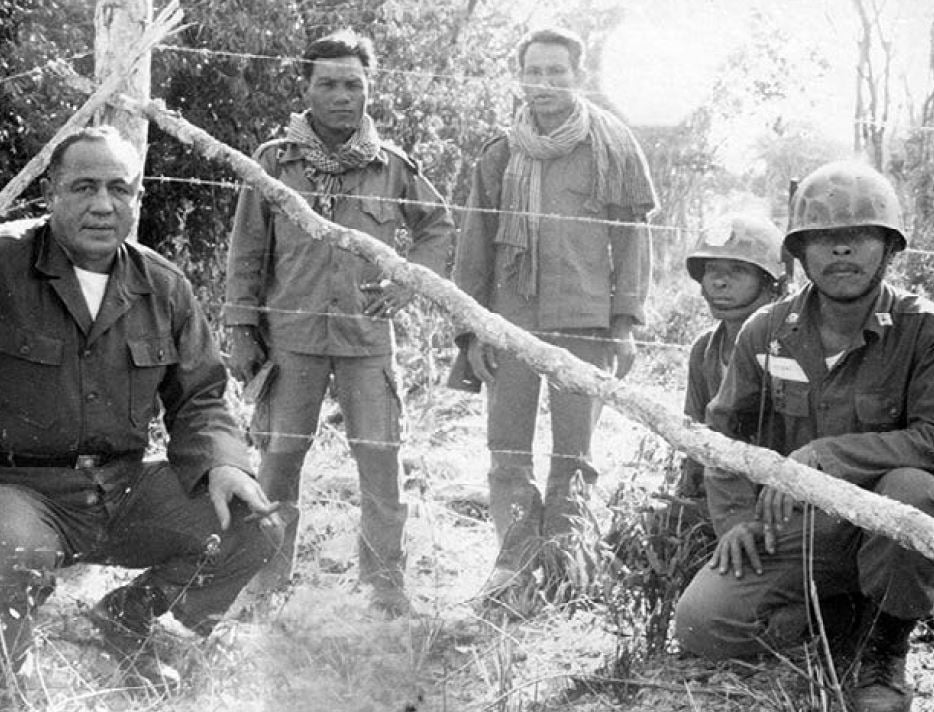
Louis O'Jibway (left) at the border of Thailand and Laos. In the center are Lao guerrillas, and kneeling on the right are members of the Thai Border Patrol Police.

O'Jibway was assigned to oversee the agency's activities in the northwestern provinces – nicknamed SKY – and established his post at Chiang Khong, Thailand, across the Mekong River from Laos, in mid-1963. As the senior CIA case officer in the region, he was responsible for coordinating paramilitary operations and intelligence collection. Despite tribal rivalries, interference from Laotian military officials, and growing U.S. pressure to expand guerrilla operations against the Ho Chi Minh trail, O'Jibway was regarded by associates as calm, professional, and respected by subordinates.

In 1964, O'Jibway took leave to attend his daughters' graduation from high school. After the ceremony, while he was flying back over the Pacific, his wife was killed in an automobile accident. O'Jibway brought his son Buddy to work with him at Air America in Southeast Asia, where Buddy became a baggage handler.

O'Jibway and his field personnel continued expanding a guerrilla network among the mountain populations of northwestern Laos while assisting a United States Agency for International Development (USAID) program to improve public health and sanitation in the region. He recruited members from several tribal groups and organized a training camp near his base in Chiang Khong. During the 1964–65 dry season, he established a forward base, designated L-118A, near the Laotian village of Nam Yu, Luang Namtha province, about forty kilometers north of his main headquarters across the border.

The Nam Yu post, initially composed of simple bamboo and thatch buildings, was staffed by CIA paramilitary officers, an intelligence specialist, Thai radio operators, and Burmese Shan guards. It later expanded into a full guerrilla training facility. O'Jibway remained in Chiang Khong to manage finances, payroll, and supply operations. In addition to overseeing intelligence and paramilitary activities, O'Jibway supervised efforts to introduce Western medical, sanitary, and agricultural practices in the local highland communities.

O'Jibway regularly traveled into Laos by helicopter for payroll delivery, field inspection, and emergency evacuation missions. Although most major engagements occurred in northeastern Laos, clashes with communist forces also took place in the northwest by 1965. On 21 May of that year, O'Jibway carried out a rescue mission under fire, extracting CIA paramilitary officer Terrence M. Burke and several wounded personnel after they came under attack by North Vietnamese units. His intervention allowed the remaining tribal fighters to withdraw safely.

=== Vietnam War escalation in Laos ===
In 1965, President Lyndon B. Johnson ordered ground troops into South Vietnam in a major escalation of the Vietnam War. As a result, the CIA's entire mission in Laos changed from hit-and-run style attacks to massive ground missions with air support. It was at this time that the Air Force began regular bombing targets in Laos. O'Jibway, alongside most of his fellow advisors, voiced his concerns about this, but was overruled. This escalation of the covert campaign in Laos led to increasing casualties among all participants, including U.S. pilots and CIA personnel operating in the region.

In the early summer of 1965, O'Jibway received new directives to expand operations in northwestern Laos beyond local defense forces. He began organizing a larger offensive contingent intended to reinforce General Vang Pao's Hmong guerrilla army in the northeastern part of the country. The first of these units, a 500-man Special Guerrilla Battalion, was too large for local facilities and was therefore airlifted several hundred miles south to Hua Hin, Thailand, where its members underwent three months of advanced training beginning in July 1965.

== Death and legacy ==
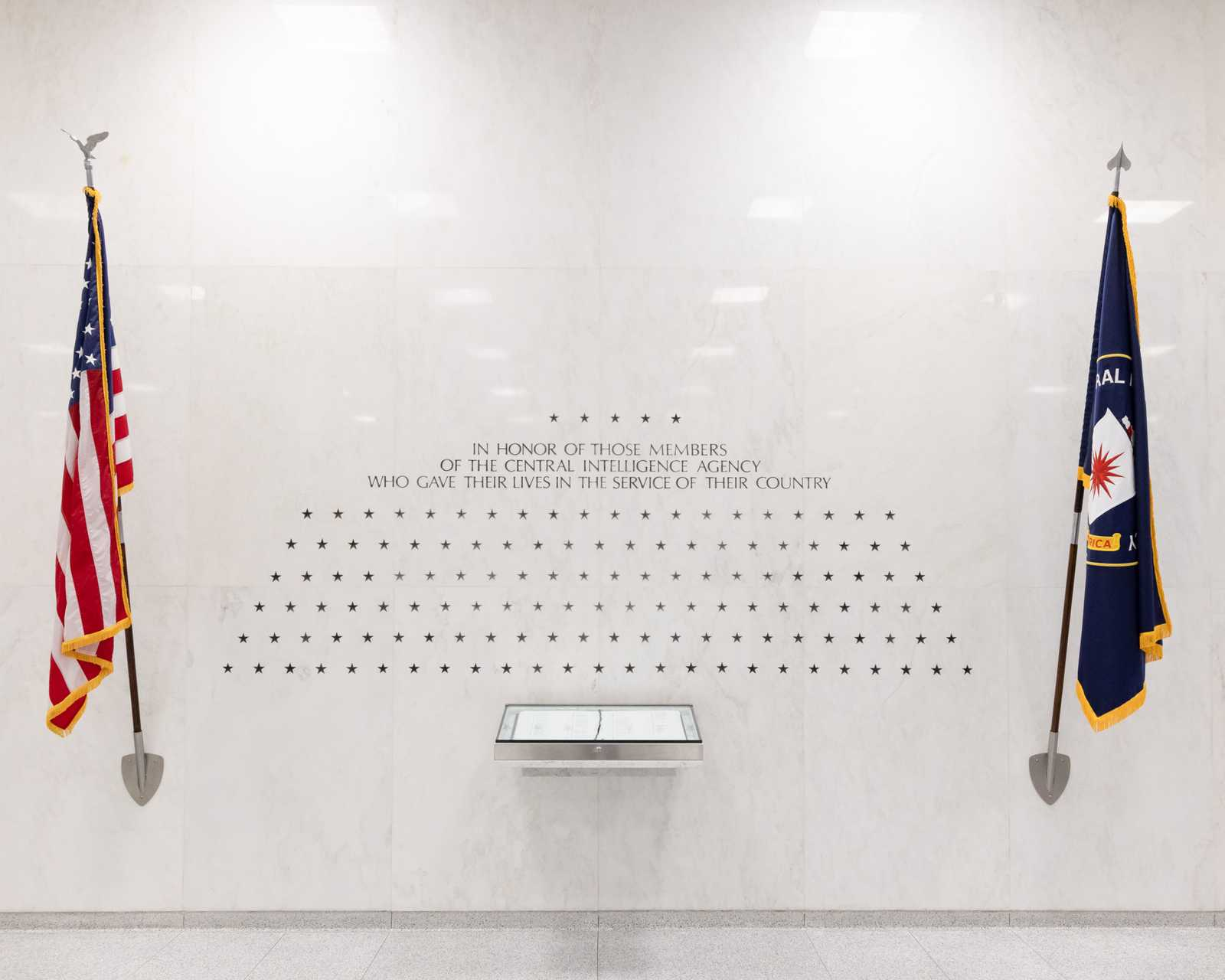
O'Jibway is recognized with a star on the CIA Memorial Wall and an entry in the Book of Honor.

On August 20, 1965, while traveling by helicopter from the forward base at Nam Yu to the CIA's coordination center at Udorn, Thailand, O'Jibway and several other key figures from the United States, Thailand, and Laos were killed when their UH-34 helicopter crashed into the Mekong River near Vientiane, the Laotian capital.

The majority of passengers and pilots managed to escape the sinking helicopter, but those who could not immediately swim to shore were swept downstream by the current. Several were found dead later along the shoreline downriver. One man was found alive, having clung to a piece of driftwood and swept downriver for 60 miles.

However, O'Jibway was listed as Missing in action for a year, before being declared "presumably dead" by the CIA.The CIA officially designated him with a "presumptive determination" date of death as of August 20, 1966, exactly 1 year after the crash. His body was never found, and is still considered missing. Some rumors exist that he was cremated or buried somewhere in Thailand.

In 1974, he was posthumously awarded the Exceptional Service Medallion. He was one of the original 31 stars on the CIA Memorial Wall at the CIA Headquarters Building.

Because OSS personnel were bound by secrecy agreements and the organization's records remained classified for decades, O'Jibway's WW2 wartime service was largely unknown to the public. His WW2 service did not become recognized until the early 21st century, after the declassification of OSS archives.
