= William "Chief" Carlson =

American CIA officer, member of the Blackfeet Nation

William Francis "Chief" Carlson
- Born: November 17, 1959
- Died: October 25, 2003 (aged 43); Shkin, Paktika Province, Afghanistan
- Other name: Eseen Amakan
- Occupations: U.S. Army soldier; CIA paramilitary officer
- Known for: Service with Delta Force and CIA Special Activities Center

William Francis "Chief" Carlson (Eseen Amakan) (November 17, 1959 – October 25, 2003) was an American military veteran and a Central Intelligence Agency (CIA) paramilitary officer who died in Shkin, Paktika Province, Afghanistan, on October 25, 2003. Carlson had served as a member of the elite Delta Force, a special operations unit of the U.S. Army, before joining the CIA's Special Activities Center. He went by "Chief" in deference to his Blackfeet Nation heritage.

== Early life ==
William Francis Carlson was raised in Northern California by his mother and father, a former Marine, in a family from the Blackfeet. He had an older brother and an older sister. His father and grandmother taught him the Plains Algonquian language, and his tough upbringing helped shape his resilience. Although he wasn't an exceptional student, he excelled in art and enjoyed football, developing a keen interest in military history.

== U.S. military career ==
In 1979, Carlson chose to join the U.S. Army instead of attending college. He earned Airborne and Ranger qualifications and served with the 75th Ranger Regiment. After leaving the Army, he reenlisted in 1985, joined the Special Forces, and earned his Green Beret and Combat Diver qualification. His military career eventually led him to Delta Force. Carlson had a reputation as "one of the toughest of the tough."

== CIA service and death ==
After retiring from the U.S. Army, Carlson joined the CIA as a paramilitary officer. On October 25, 2003, he was part of a team tracking Al-Qaeda operatives, including the inner circle of Bin Laden, near Shkin, Afghanistan, in Humvee and Toyota Hilux trucks. At the time, he was on patrol with a force of the Afghan militia (the origins of the CIA's Counterterrorist Pursuit Teams). According to retired Navy SEAL Mark Donald, present during the attack, Carlson was at the wheel of a humvee when his unit came under fire. A rocket-propelled grenade struck the vehicle, and Carlson turned the vehicle so his comrades could escape, putting himself in the line of automatic-weapons fire that claimed his life. Carlson is believed to have sacrificed himself to protect his team. After the initial attack, former Navy SEAL and CIA contractor Christopher Glenn Mueller was killed while coming to the aid of Carlson and others.

The ambush coincided with a six-hour firefight in the area that resulted in the deaths of 18 alleged al-Qaeda fighters, with coalition airpower supporting the battle. The Shkin base, 135 miles south of Kabul, was a critical forward position for U.S. forces and frequently targeted by insurgents crossing from neighboring Pakistan. The region's challenging terrain and porous border contributed to ongoing instability.

== Legacy ==
In 2004, Carlson's service was recognized posthumously by the CIA. Director of Central Intelligence George J. Tenet noted in a memorial ceremony before the CIA Memorial Wall that Carlson and another operative had shown exceptional bravery. Tenet said, "The bravery of these two men cannot be overstated."

In 2010, Shayne Carlson, inspired by his father's legacy, and three friends from University of North Carolina Wilmington rode their skateboards from Virginia Beach, Virginia to Venice beach, California to raise money and awareness for the Special Operations Warrior Foundation and Operational Advocates Supporting Injured Soldiers Group. He arrived in Venice in July.

In 2014, Shayne skateboarded over 4,000 miles from Alaska to California to raise funds for True Patriot Love and the Red Circle Foundation. His son has also written about his father.

In 2017, his wife attended a war crimes Guantanamo military commission for Abdulhadi al-Iraqi who was charged with funding and directing the attacks that killed Carlson. Hadi served as Osama bin Laden's senior military commander at the time.
