= Dario Lorenzetti =

American military officer and intelligence operative

Dario Natale Lorenzetti (May 20, 1970 – October 13, 2012) was an American military officer and intelligence operative who served in the U.S. Army and later in the Central Intelligence Agency (CIA). A graduate of the United States Military Academy at West Point, he held positions in the 101st Airborne Division, the 75th Ranger Regiment, and the 1st Infantry Division. After transitioning to intelligence work, Lorenzetti was killed in Afghanistan in a suicide bombing. His contributions were honored with a star on the CIA Memorial Wall.

== Early life and education ==
Born in Fort Worth, Texas, Lorenzetti attended St. Andrews Catholic School and Nolan Catholic High School, where he participated in athletics and earned the rank of Eagle Scout through Boy Scouts. After spending one year at Texas A&M University, he transferred to the United States Military Academy at West Point and graduated in 1993.

== Career ==
=== Military ===
After graduating from West Point, Lorenzetti served for roughly a decade as an officer in the U.S. Army. His assignments included postings with the 101st Airborne Division, the 75th Ranger Regiment, and the 1st Infantry Division. During his military service, he also held a position as a professor of military science at Texas A&M University.

=== CIA ===
While serving in Afghanistan, Lorenzetti was killed on October 13, 2012, in an incident involving a suicide vest detonated by an Afghan intelligence operative. A star was carved into the CIA Memorial Wall to honor Lorenzetti. At the time of his death, the media reported that he worked for the United States Department of State.

Following his death, details regarding Lorenzetti's affiliation with the Central Intelligence Agency (CIA) were leaked through internal emails. Defense Department official Jeremy Bash sent an email that referenced Lorenzetti's role, which was subsequently forwarded to aides of then–Secretary of State Hillary Clinton—including Philippe Reines, Cheryl Mills, and Jake Sullivan—and ultimately appeared on Clinton's private email server. Although the email was not classified at the time it was sent, reports indicate that Lorenzetti's CIA affiliation was leaked to the press four days after his death.

== Tributes ==
Worth Ranch, a Boy Scouts camp, dedicated a pavilion in honor of Lorenzetti.
