= George A. Whitney =

American military personnel

George Alexius Whitney (February 16, 1978 – December 18, 2016) was an American Marine Corps officer and CIA paramilitary contractor. Whitney's career included service as a platoon commander in the U.S. Marine Corps and later as a CIA case officer and paramilitary contractor, with assignments in counterterrorism operations. He was killed during a mission in Afghanistan in 2016 and is honored on the CIA Memorial Wall and interred at Arlington National Cemetery.

== Early life and education ==
Born in Brattleboro, Vermont, Whitney attended Brooks School in North Andover, Massachusetts, and later Bates College in Lewiston, Maine. At Bates, he was a starting fullback in football and a midfielder in lacrosse, graduating cum laude with a major in Classics.

== Military service ==
After college, Whitney joined the U.S. Marine Corps, serving as a platoon commander with the 3rd Reconnaissance Battalion. He was deployed to Anbar Province, Iraq, in 2005, where he led his unit. However, following a disputed decision to detain a suspected insurgent, he faced a board of inquiry and received an honorable discharge in 2006.

== CIA Career ==
In 2008, Whitney joined the CIA as a case officer, with assignments including Karachi, Pakistan, focusing on counterterrorism operations. Personality conflicts with superiors led to his departure from the agency after the 2011 raid on Osama bin Laden's compound. Whitney returned to the CIA as a paramilitary contractor, seeking the camaraderie and sense of purpose he found in such roles.

=== Final Mission and Legacy ===
In 2016, after the loss of close teammates, Whitney volunteered for a high-risk mission in Afghanistan. He was fatally shot during an assault on a Taliban compound on December 18, 2016. He is honored on the CIA Memorial Wall, and he is interred at Arlington National Cemetery.

In 2017, efforts emerged to honor Whitney with a permanent sculpture on the Bates College campus. Led by a fellow Marine veteran, the initiative aimed to commemorate Whitney's life and service. Bates College decided to honor all veterans in its community collectively, rather than recognizing any individual alumnus, including Whitney, through its Veterans Plaza installation.
