= Spookstock =

U.S. intelligence community music event

Spookstock or SOFstock is an annual, invitation-only charity event and music festival organized by members of the U.S. intelligence community and the Spookstock Foundation. The event is known for its secrecy, with details about its location, date, and attendees kept confidential. Spookstock primarily raises funds for the CIA Officers Memorial Foundation, which provides educational scholarships and support to the children of CIA officers killed in the line of duty, the Special Operations Warrior Foundation, which supports the families of fallen special operations personnel, and the Defense Intelligence Memorial Foundation. The event also serves as an opportunity for the young beneficiaries of the supported foundations to meet each other and network. The daughter of Johnny Micheal Spann is involved in the foundation. Her father, a paramilitary officer in the CIA, was first American killed in combat during the United States invasion of Afghanistan in 2001.

The event has attracted approximately 1,800 attendees in recent years, including high-profile performers such as Billy Idol Lenny Kravitz, Peter Frampton, ZZ Top, and the Steve Miller Band. The guest list includes members of the intelligence and military communities, as well as defense contractors and corporate sponsors, who contribute significantly to the fundraising efforts. Despite its exclusivity, Spookstock has grown in popularity and visibility, leading organizers to consider expanding the event to other locations.
