= Nannamoria bulbosa =

Scientific classification
- Kingdom: Animalia
- Phylum: Mollusca
- Class: Gastropoda
- Subclass: Caenogastropoda
- Order: Neogastropoda
- Family: Volutidae
- Genus: Nannamoria
- Species: N. bulbosa

Binomial name
- Nannamoria bulbosa Bail & Limpus, 2008

Species of gastropod

Nannamoria bulbosa is a species of sea snail, a marine gastropod mollusk in the family Volutidae, the volutes.
