= Nannamoria inflata =

Scientific classification
- Kingdom: Animalia
- Phylum: Mollusca
- Class: Gastropoda
- Subclass: Caenogastropoda
- Order: Neogastropoda
- Family: Volutidae
- Genus: Nannamoria
- Species: N. inflata

Binomial name
- Nannamoria inflata Bail & limpus, 2008

Species of gastropod

Nannamoria inflata is a species of sea snail, a marine gastropod mollusk in the family Volutidae, the volutes.
