= Tucker Gougelmann =

United States Marine Corps officer

Tucker Pierre Edward Power Gougelmann
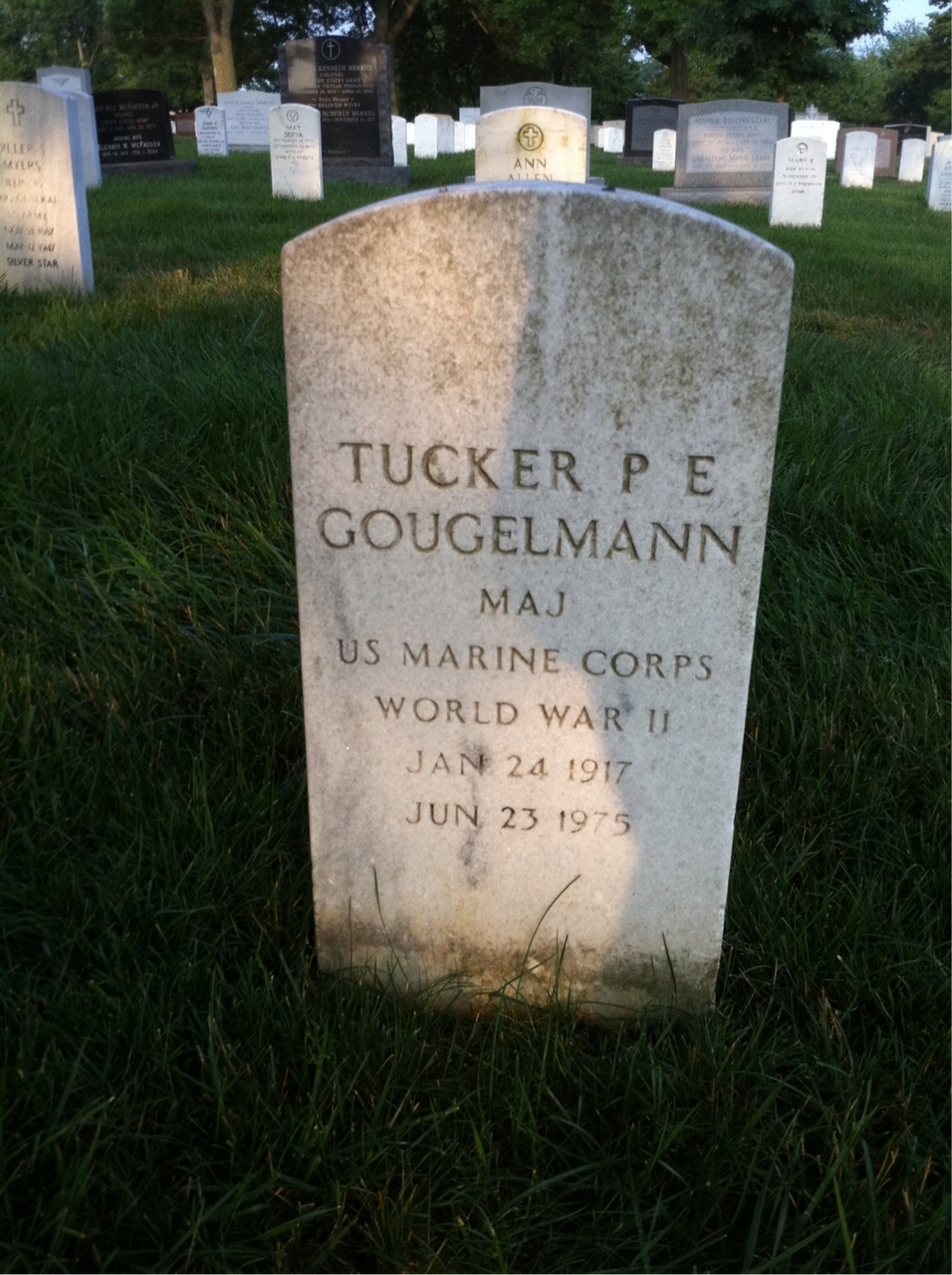
- Grave at Arlington National Cemetery
- Born: January 24, 1917; New Jersey, U.S.
- Died: June 23, 1975 (aged 58); Ho Chi Minh City, Vietnam
- Military career
- Allegiance: United States
- Branch: United States Marine Corps; Central Intelligence Agency
- Service years: 1942–1949 (U.S. Marine Corps); 1949–1972 (CIA)
- Rank: Colonel (U.S. Marine Corps); Paramilitary Operations Officer (CIA)
- Units: Marine Raider battalion Special Activities Division
- Conflicts: World War II; Korean War; Vietnam War
- Awards: Purple Heart; Intelligence Star

Tucker Pierre Edward Power Gougelmann (January 24, 1917 – June 23, 1975) was a United States Marine Corps colonel, World War II veteran, and a Central Intelligence Agency officer in their Special Activities Division who died in Vietnam in 1975.

== World War II and entry into the CIA ==
During the war, he served in the Pacific, participating in battles such as Guadalcanal. During the Solomon Islands campaign, he suffered a severe wound as the result of being shot in the right leg by a Japanese sniper while he was helping to move his fellow soldiers who were wounded out of danger.

Although the military doctors told him that his leg would have to be amputated as part of his treatment, Gougelmann was intent on returning to service and therefore did not give permission for doctors to proceed with the amputation. He wound up keeping his leg but as a result his convalescence lasted for two years. During this time, he was decorated with a Purple Heart, in recognition of him having sustained the injury in combat.

By the time he had recovered and was returned to active duty, the war was drawing to a close. Gougelmann remained in the Corps until his honorable discharge in 1949. Wanting to continue in service to his country, Gougelmann joined the then nascent Central Intelligence Agency, which had been created from the embattled Central Intelligence Group (CIG) following the National Security Act of 1947 which Truman had signed into law two years prior.

Although the CIG had difficulty attracting "the best and the brightest", the newly formed CIA had no difficulty in doing so. The CIA attracted many recent graduates of top educational institutions, such as Ivy League universities. It was viewed as presenting a unique set of challenges, interesting work, and the opportunity to serve the country at the beginning of the Cold War.

== Cold War service ==
Gougelmann's first assignment was to Korea during the Korean War from 1950 to 1953. There, he participated in covert operations, including helping agents to infiltrate the North. His experience in covert operations was subsequently put to use in the CIA's attempts to overthrow Fidel Castro in Cuba during the mid/late 1950s and early 1960s. Gougelmann may have been involved in the botched Bay of Pigs Invasion in 1961, although this is not confirmed. Following the CIA's failed attempts to remove Castro from power, and the public relations problems that it caused for the Kennedy Administration, the CIA's role with respect to Cuba was severely curtailed as the Cold War's active theater moved from Cuba back to other parts of the world, including Southeast Asia. Gougelmann's assignments during that time took him to Afghanistan as well as various locations in Europe.

== Vietnam ==
In 1962, Gougelmann was assigned to South Vietnam. He continued to specialize in covert paramilitary operations work, coordinating Nasty boat raids against the North using Nationalist Chinese posing as civilians as part of Operation 34A. Following the conclusion of the raiding program, Gougelmann was assigned to the CIA's Saigon Station where his knowledge of covert operations methods was put to use in the domestic counter-intelligence work of a local governmental entity. Being settled in a location for the first time in a long while, Gougelmann began a family life there with a local woman.

In 1972, Gougelmann retired from the CIA and had departed South Vietnam before the Fall of Saigon and was living in Bangkok, Thailand as a civilian. When his family could not be evacuated from Saigon prior to the impending North Vietnamese victory, he returned on his own. Once there, he established contact with his family, but had difficulty finding a way to get them out of the country. In the environment of that time, his continued presence was very unsafe, as an American CIA officer would be a prime catch for the triumphant North Vietnamese.

Despite his attempts to hide, including stuffing himself into an alcove behind a refrigerator, he was eventually found during a search conducted by the police on the advice of a local Vietnamese on March 29, 1975.

== Capture, interrogation and torture ==
Gougelmann was immediately taken into custody and kept in the main prison of the area, Chí Hòa Prison. A French reporter had witnessed his arrest and he was reportedly seen by Vietnamese prisoners in Wing ED, where he was being kept. The Vietnamese government denied that they were holding him, despite being presented with evidence to the contrary. Details of his imprisonment are limited and unconfirmed, and his treatment by the Vietnamese during his captivity is based on examination of the evidence after the fact.

He was removed from the prison several times to be taken for interrogation, and government officials believe he was tortured during this time. The Vietnamese government continued to deny that they were holding Gougelmann for the remainder of 1975 and 1976, but in 1977 they released his remains to U.S. authorities. Postmortem examination by U.S. government officials indicated that Gougelmann was tortured during his captivity, as evidenced primarily by a very large number of broken bones which appeared to have been broken and re-broken after healing.

According to Bien Hoa CIA spymaster Orrin DeForrest in his book Slow Burn: The Rise and Bitter Fall of American Intelligence in Vietnam, Gougelmann had been retired and living in Saigon since 1973 with his Vietnamese wife. DeForrest stated:

He could have gotten out easily enough but he was a hard-nosed son of a bitch and he decided not to... He considered himself, practically speaking, a Vietnamese citizen. And he was not the kind of guy who would back down from anybody. He was retired, he told me when I last saw him, completely separated from any government work. Why should he get out for these pissants? He'd be damned if he was going to let anyone drive him away. Tucker was a stubborn man, tall, strong, and in excellent health. He was not the kind to die of malnutrition, not in the six months Hanoi had him before they shipped his body back home. I knew in my heart that they had tortured him to death.

== After death ==
Before leaving Bangkok for Vietnam, Gougelmann asked a friend to try to get his family, including his youngest son, Edward who was born after Gougelmann's arrest, out of Vietnam and to the United States if he ran afoul of the Vietnamese authorities. After contacting American government officials in the CIA, Congress, and other high-ranking government offices, the friend succeeded in obtaining visas which allowed the family to emigrate to the United States.

After Gougelmann's remains were returned to the United States, he was buried at Arlington National Cemetery. His grave is located next to that of Francis Gary Powers.

Though not serving in an official capacity at the time of his arrest in 1975, the CIA decided that Gougelmann's death was a result of the official CIA activity that he had been involved with previously in Vietnam and granted him a star on the CIA Memorial Wall at CIA Headquarters in Langley, Virginia which commemorates those CIA staff who died in the line of duty.

== See also ==
- Special Activities Division
