= Michael Goodboe =

American CIA and Navy operative (1966–2020)

Michael Raymond "Goody" Goodboe (July 6, 1966 – November 21/22, 2020) was a senior Central Intelligence Agency paramilitary officer with the Special Activities Center and former member of United States Navy SEAL Team Six who was killed in a terrorist attack presumed to have been conducted by Al-Shabaab (militant group) in Mogadishu, Somalia, on November 21/22, 2020.

== Military career ==
Goodboe was from Homestead, Florida. He joined the Navy in 1989. In 1992 Goodboe reported to Basic Underwater Demolition/SEAL training (BUD/S) training at Naval Amphibious Base Coronado. After six months of training he graduated BUD/S class 179 and reported to SEAL Team Eight at NAB Little Creek, VA. Following SEAL tactical training and completion of six month probationary period, he received the NEC 5326 as a Combatant Swimmer (SEAL), entitled to wear the Special Warfare insignia. In June 1996, Goodboe volunteered for assignment to Naval Special Warfare Development Group (commonly known as SEAL TEAM SIX or NSWDG) at Dam Neck, Virginia and completed a specialized selection and training course. Goodboe served as an Assault Team Member and Troop Chief and participated in operations in support of Operations Enduring Freedom and Iraqi Freedom. In January 2005, he was commissioned as a Chief Warrant Officer and, upon completion of CWO school, reported to SEAL Team Two. There, he participated in deployments to Operations Enduring Freedom and Iraqi Freedom. He returned to NSWDG in July 2006 and retired in January 2009.

=== Death in Somalia ===
At the time of his death, he was serving with the CIA's Special Activities Center, supporting U.S. efforts to assist Somali forces in their fight against al-Shabaab, an al-Qaeda-affiliated terrorist group with around 9,000 fighters. Goodboe's death occurred during a period when approximately 700 U.S. troops were stationed in Somalia, working alongside African Union forces to stabilize the region. He was reportedly flown to Landstuhl Regional Medical Center after the attack.

=== Legacy ===
Goodboe's name was added to the CIA Memorial Wall at the agency's headquarters in Langley, Virginia. His family started the "Raised for Honor" foundation after his death.

== Awards and decorations ==
During his military career he earned Silver Star Medal for extraordinary heroism, four Bronze Star Medals (two with Valor Device), three Defense Meritorious Service Medals, the Joint Service Commendation Medal, the Navy and Marine Corps Commendation Medal, the Joint Service Achievement Medal with Valor Device, three Joint Service Achievement Medals, the Navy and Marine Corps Achievement Medal, Combat Action Ribbon, Navy Presidential Unit Citation Medal, Afghanistan Campaign Medal, Iraq Campaign Medal, Global War on Terrorism Service Medal, five Sea Service Deployment Ribbons, Expert Rifleman, and Expert Pistol Shot.
