= Gregg Wenzel =

American intelligence officer (1969–2003)

- Born: Gregg David Wenzel; November 18, 1969; Manhattan, New York, U.S.
- Died: July 9, 2003 (aged 33); Addis Ababa, Ethiopia
- Education: Binghamton University (BA); University of Miami (JD)

Gregg David Wenzel (November 18, 1969 – July 9, 2003) was an American intelligence officer and attorney who served in the National Clandestine Service Officer of the Central Intelligence Agency. Wenzel was killed while serving in Ethiopia in 2003.

== Early life and education ==
He was born in Manhattan, New York to Gladys and Mitch Wenzel. Wenzel spent his childhood in the Bronx and Monroe, New York. He was a graduate of Monroe-Woodbury Senior High School in 1987, and Binghamton University in 1991. He studied abroad at Tel Aviv University and received his Juris Doctor from the University of Miami School of Law in 1994.

== Career ==
After graduating, Wenzel worked as an Assistant Public Defender for Miami-Dade County, Florida for three years. He then worked as Bar Counsel for the Florida Bar. Wenzel was a police academy instructor for the Miami-Dade Community College-North Campus School of Justice and Safety Administration, Assistant Public Defender for Dade County and also served on the Florida Bar Counsel where he tried Supreme Court cases.

== Death ==
At the time of his death, Wenzel was 33 years old, and employed as a clandestine officer of the Central Intelligence Agency, where he was stationed in Addis Ababa, Ethiopia. Wenzel's cover was as an employee of the United States Department of State. Wenzel was killed by a drunk driver on July 9, 2003.

On June 1, 2009, the CIA uncovered Wenzel's identity as a clandestine services officer.

On July 23, 2012 the United States House of Representatives passed bill HR-3593, designating the Wenzel's local U.S. Postal Service Office in Monroe, New York as the "National Clandestine Service of the Central Intelligence Agency NCS Officer Gregg David Wenzel Memorial Post Office."

Wenzel is represented by star number 81 on the CIA Memorial Wall.
