= Tom Shah =

United States intelligence officer (1961–1998)

Uttamlal Thomas "Tom" Shah (July 14, 1961 – August 7, 1998) was an American intelligence officer with the Central Intelligence Agency (CIA) who was killed in the 1998 U.S. Embassy bombing in Nairobi, Kenya. Shah's work was not publicly acknowledged by the CIA due to the classified nature of his duties.

== Early life and education ==
Tom Shah was born to an Indian immigrant father and an American mother. He attended St. Xavier High School in Cincinnati, Ohio, where he participated in the school's model United Nations program and was one of the first students to study Russian during the Cold War.

Shah pursued a degree in music, earning a bachelor's degree from Berklee College of Music in Boston and a master's degree from Ball State University. He played trumpet at Berklee.

He completed his doctoral thesis at Ball State University, focusing on the solo songs of composer Edward MacDowell. Ball State hosts the Tom Shah Memorial Jazz Scholarship Award Concert.

== Career with the CIA ==
In 1987, Shah joined the U.S. government under diplomatic cover, eventually becoming a CIA officer after completing training at the agency's facility in Virginia. Fluent in Hindi and Russian, Shah was later assigned to the CIA's Near East Division, where he served in locations including Cairo and Damascus. He also learned Arabic during his time with the agency.

In 1997, Shah joined the Iraq Operations Group, where he was involved in a sensitive intelligence operation related to Iraq. As part of this mission, he was sent to Nairobi, Kenya, to meet with an Iraqi official who was offering intelligence in exchange for asylum in the United States.

=== Death and commemoration ===
On August 7, 1998, Shah was killed in a truck bombing at the U.S. Embassy in Nairobi. He was 37 years old. The bombing also claimed the life of his CIA colleague, Molly Huckaby Hardy. Although publicly identified as a State Department employee, Shah's role as a CIA officer was recognized internally at the agency.

Shah's name is commemorated on the CIA Memorial Wall at the agency's headquarters in Langley, Virginia. He is also remembered with a plaque in a conference room at CIA headquarters.

=== Bin Laden death ===
In a May 2011 raid, Osama bin Laden's death provided a sense of closure for some CIA veterans, as reported by The Associated Press. Shah's and Hardy's deaths are believed to be the first CIA casualties in the conflict between the U.S. and al-Qaida. CIA Director Leon Panetta mentioned them during a ceremony for fallen officers, noting that those who threaten global peace eventually confront America's military and intelligence personnel.
