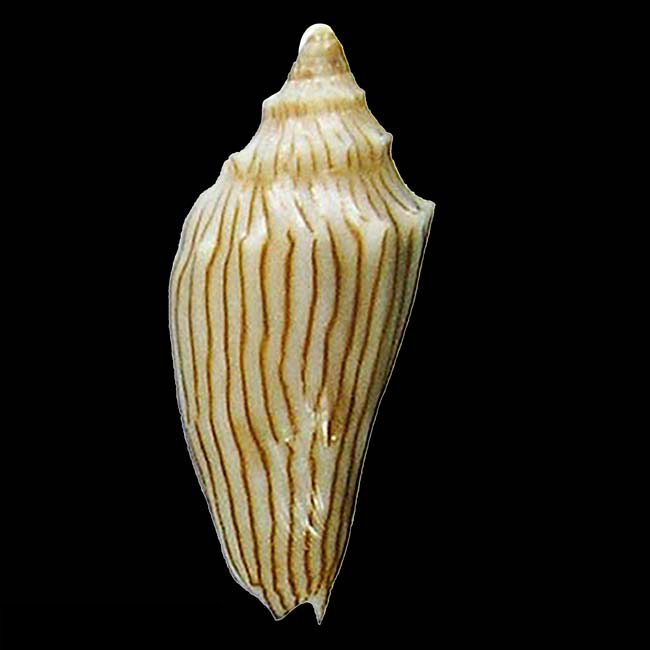
- Nannamoria gotoi

Scientific classification
- Kingdom: Animalia
- Phylum: Mollusca
- Class: Gastropoda
- Subclass: Caenogastropoda
- Order: Neogastropoda
- Superfamily: Volutoidea
- Family: Volutidae
- Genus: Nannamoria; Iredale 1927

Type species
- Nannamoria amicula Iredale, 1929

= Nannamoria =

Genus of gastropods

Nannamoria is a small taxonomic genus of small-sized sea snails, predatory marine gastropod molluscs in the subfamily Amoriinae of the family Volutidae, the volutes.

== Distribution ==
Nannamoria volutes are endemic to Australia. They are found on the east and southern coast, in deep water on the outer continental shelf.

== Shell description ==
The shells of Nannamoria have a small blunt protoconch, their overall shape varies but most species have a shoulder with nodules or spines. The base colour of the shells of Nannamoria is white, and they are overlaid with brown axial lines.

== Biology ==
These volutes live in very deep water and little is known about their live appearance or their biology.

== Species ==
The genus Nannamoria includes the following species:

- Nannamoria amicula Iredale, 1929
- Nannamoria breviforma Bail & Limpus, 2008
- Nannamoria bulbosa Bail & Limpus, 2008
- Nannamoria gotoi Poppe, 1992
- Nannamoria inflata Bail & Limpus, 2008
- Nannamoria inopinata Darragh, 1979
- Nannamoria parabola Garrard, 1960
- Nannamoria ranya Willan, 1995
