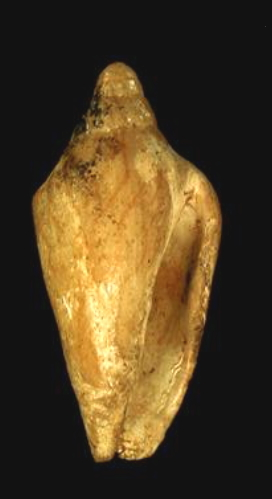
- Shell of Nannamoria amicula (holotype in the Australian Museum)

Scientific classification
- Kingdom: Animalia
- Phylum: Mollusca
- Class: Gastropoda
- Subclass: Caenogastropoda
- Order: Neogastropoda
- Family: Volutidae
- Genus: Nannamoria
- Species: N. amicula

Binomial name
- Nannamoria amicula Iredale, 1929

= Nannamoria amicula =

Species of gastropod

Nannamoria amicula is a species of sea snail, a marine gastropod mollusk in the family Volutidae, the volutes.

== Description ==
The length of the shell attains 27·5 mm, its diameter 12 mm.

(Original description) The shell is very small, with a spire that is less than half the length of the aperture and tapers to a point (acuminate). The color of the dead shell is white with irregular yellow longitudinal lines.

Sculptural features include eight nodules on the shoulder of the body whorl, with approximately twelve nodules on the preceding two whorls. A three-whorled, smooth protoconch is present. The body whorl is shouldered, and the aperture is narrow, almost linear. The outer lip is thickened but lacks any significant varices (prominent ridges).

The columella exhibits six plaits, with three larger plaits alternating with three smaller ones.

== Distribution ==
This marine species is endemic to Australia and occurs off New South Wales.
