= Nannamoria inopinata =

Scientific classification
- Kingdom: Animalia
- Phylum: Mollusca
- Class: Gastropoda
- Subclass: Caenogastropoda
- Order: Neogastropoda
- Family: Volutidae
- Genus: Nannamoria
- Species: N. inopinata

Binomial name
- Nannamoria inopinata Darragh, 1979

Species of sea snail

Nannamoria inopinata is a species of sea snail, a marine gastropod mollusk in the family Volutidae, the volutes. It was first discovered by paleontologist Thomas A. Darragh in 1979.

== Description ==
The shell is generally small, reaching lengths of about 40 to 50 mm. Its shell is pear-shaped with a dome-like spire. Its color is usually light fawn to cream, decorated with thin, spiral chestnut-colored lines.The shell's columella, or central pillar, usually has two or three major folds or "plaits".

== Distribution ==
This snail is endemic to Australia and is specifically found in the Capricorn Channel off central Queensland. It lives in deep water, typically at depths between 168 and 365 meters.
