= Brian Hoke =

American Naval officer (1974–2016)

Brian Ray Hoke (April 4, 1974 – October 21, 2016) was an American Navy SEAL and CIA paramilitary officer who served on the front lines of counterterrorism operations. He was killed in action during an assault on an Islamic State compound in Afghanistan.

== Early life and education ==
Born in Cambridge, Nebraska, Hoke grew up in Aberdeen, South Dakota, where he developed a love for the outdoors, engaging in activities like hiking and fishing. He attended Aberdeen Central High. Hoke participated in football, basketball, tennis, and swimming, and was an accomplished violinist, earning a place in the All-State Orchestra. He was posthumously inducted in the Aberdeen High Hall of Fame for the Class of 1992.

After his family moved to Minnesota before his senior year, Hoke graduated from high school and received a congressional nomination to attend the United States Naval Academy. He graduated in 1996 with a degree in oceanography.

== Military career ==
Fulfilling his aspiration to become a Navy SEAL, Hoke completed the rigorous Basic Underwater Demolition/SEAL (BUD/S) training with Class 210 in April 1997. He served in SEAL Delivery Vehicle Team Two and SEAL Teams Three and Seven, undertaking deployments to various regions, including Europe and the Middle East.

== CIA career ==
In 2003, Hoke transitioned to the Central Intelligence Agency (CIA), joining its elite Special Activities Division (SAD), now known as the Special Activities Center. His role involved leading combat missions and gathering intelligence in conflict zones such as Iraq and Afghanistan, as well as assignments in Europe.

=== Death ===
On October 21, 2016, Hoke was killed in action during an operation against Islamic State militants near Jalalabad, Afghanistan. He was 42 years old. Hoke's death, along with that of his colleague Nathaniel Delemarre, highlighted the significant sacrifices made by CIA operatives in Afghanistan. Both men were honored with stars on the CIA Memorial Wall, which commemorates CIA personnel who have died in the line of duty. He was awarded an Intelligence Star. He is buried at Arlington National Cemetery.

=== Legacy ===
His wife and friends ran the Antarctic Ice Marathon in his memory. In 2014, Hoke ran the Polar Circle Half Marathon to benefit the Navy SEAL Foundation.

His family has worked with the CIA Officers Memorial Foundation.

== Personal life ==
At the time of his death, he lived in Leesburg, Virginia. He was married with three children. Hoke enjoyed painting.
