= 2008 disappearance of CIA operatives in the South China Sea =

2008 missing person case

Four Central Intelligence Agency (CIA) operatives disappeared during a covert mission in the South China Sea off the coast of the Philippines in 2008. The operation, conducted by the Special Operations Group's Maritime Branch, involved four CIA operatives: Stephen Stanek, Michael Perich, Jamie McCormick, and Daniel Meeks. They embarked on the mission to monitor Chinese military activities, specifically People's Liberation Army Navy, in a disputed area north of Luzon, the largest island in the Philippines. The operation aimed to deploy a surveillance device disguised as a rock. The operatives faced deteriorating conditions caused by Tropical Storm Higos, and all four men died during the storm. Their unexplained disappearance prompted internal debates within the CIA and spurred a reassessment of maritime intelligence strategies, leading to more cautious practices in future operations.

== Operation ==
=== Geopolitical context ===
The operation took place amid growing tensions between China and the United States over control and activity in the South China Sea. The operation occurred in the South China Sea, a disputed area that is at the center of a continuing rivalry involving China, Taiwan, Vietnam, Malaysia, the Philippines, and several other nations. The CIA was competing with other U.S. entities, including the United States Navy, to demonstrate the utility of clandestine maritime operations.

=== Details ===
The mission in September 2008 was framed as a routine ship transfer. The ship had been registered to a front company in the Philippines. The operatives were on board a 40-foot vessel, which departed from Malaysia toward Japan. According to the cover story, a Japanese client had purchased the boat, and the team was responsible for delivering it. However, their true objective was to plant a pod (disguised as a rock) equipped with classified technology just beneath the water's surface to monitor signals from Chinese naval forces in the area.

The team consisted of Stanek, a former Navy ordnance diver, and Perich, a recent Merchant Marine Academy graduate with scuba diving experience, alongside McCormick and Meeks, who held supporting roles. The mission was planned with no official links to the U.S. government.

=== Tropical storm encounter ===
Despite a looming threat from Tropical Storm Higos, Stanek chose to proceed with the mission based on forecasts that predicted the storm would change course.

As the storm intensified and failed to shift direction, the vessel encountered severe weather conditions. The ship's beacon tracked the crew as it entered the storm's center, after which all communication was lost. No traces of the operatives or the vessel were recovered, and subsequent recovery efforts, coordinated through Japanese forces, yielded no results.

=== Aftermath ===
A few months later, the CIA informed the operatives' families privately about their deaths, revealing for the first time the covert nature of their assignments. The families met with then-Director Michael Hayden. The mission became a point of internal controversy within the CIA. Former personnel criticized Bob Kandra, head of the Special Activities Division, for allegedly pressuring operatives into conducting an unnecessary operation. The incident may have contributed to a shift in U.S. intelligence operations toward automated surveillance, such as unmanned drones, to reduce the exposure of personnel.

== CIA operatives ==
The four operatives were commemorated with anonymous stars on the CIA Memorial Wall in Langley, Virginia, an honor reserved for CIA personnel who die in the line of duty.

=== Stephen Stanek ===
Stanek was born on May 13, 1958, in Elmer, Salem County, New Jersey. Stanek had a background as a Navy ordnance disposal diver. Shortly before this operation, he had obtained a captain's license for maritime operations. Stanek was associated with a covert maritime company in Panama City, Florida, which served as a commercial cover for the CIA's Maritime Branch. He and Perich planned to install the surveillance device using commercial scuba equipment.

=== Michael Perich ===
Michael R. Perich, born on September 28, 1983, graduated from Center Area High School in 2002. He attended the U.S. Merchant Marine Academy, where he trained in maritime operations and scuba diving, earning advanced certification as a diving medical technician. Perich was dedicated to physical fitness, participating in football as a middle linebacker and track and field as a sprinter and discus thrower. He was also a football player during his time at the academy. At the time of the operation, he was beginning his career in paramilitary operations As of 2014, his family was still seeking answers regarding his fate.

In his memory, the Perich family established Crusaders in America, a nonprofit organization that awards scholarships to high school seniors based on physical fitness, community service, and personal character. In 2017, his father embarked on a 2,600-mile bicycle journey from San Diego to Ground Zero in New York City to honor his son. Over 13 weeks, he rode in remembrance of his son and other fallen heroes, participating in the Cycle to Celebrate initiative started by Gold Star mother Kaye Jordan. Along the way, he connected with other Gold Star families, sharing stories and support, while reflecting on his son's values of faith and family.

=== Jamie McCormick ===
McCormick, a marine engineer, was involved in a supporting role during the covert operation. He was born to Don and Marty McCormick on August 7, 1974, and resided in Bay County, Florida. He attended Southport Elementary and Mowat Middle School, later graduating from Mosley High School in 1992. McCormick married Karrie Cameron in 1996, and they had a daughter born in 2001.

=== Daniel Wayne Meeks ===
Meeks (born 1952) also held a supporting position during the operation. Meeks was a graduate of Bay High School in Florida and attended United Electronics Institute in Tampa Bay, Florida. He worked for his father's construction company. He is buried at Forest Lawn Memorial Cemetery, Panama City, Florida.

== See also ==
- List of people who disappeared mysteriously at sea
