= Mark Rausenberger =

American intelligence officer (1967–2016)

Mark Sherman Rausenberger (November 7, 1967 – May 23, 2016) was an American intelligence officer with the Central Intelligence Agency (CIA) known for his medical, security, and intelligence roles. Originally from Davenport, Iowa, Rausenberger began his career in the U.S. Army before transitioning to the CIA. Rausenberger worked in Afghanistan, Iraq, and Somalia, contributing to U.S. missions in conflict zones. He studied at Sam Houston State University and nursing at the University of Iowa.

== Career ==
=== Somalia ===
With the U.S. Army, he was deployed to Somalia after the Battle of Mogadishu (1993) for six months as a medic and Senior Treatment Non-Commission Officer. He published a journal about his experiences in Somalia. He wrote: “During the time I wrote this diary, I was a Sergeant and a Medic in the U.S. Army. My main function in the military was as a Medic and a Treatment NCO. This is a multi task job. I was certified to suture, do minor surgeries, dispense medication, triage patients, and a little bit of everything else. I worked the medical side of the house as well as leading and supervising other medics.”

=== Afghanistan ===
He was a key figure in the CIA's early post-9/11 operations in Afghanistan. He joined the CIA's Office of the Medical Services (OMS) after qualifying as a physician's assistant with degrees from University of Texas at San Antonio and University of Nebraska–Lincoln. After the September 11 attacks, he was part of Team Alpha, one of the first CIA units inserted behind enemy lines, tasked with assisting local forces against the Taliban in Bamyan. He later played a central role in a three-man team, alongside fellow CIA officer Mike Spann and Green Beret Captain Justin Sapp, to prepare a strategic landing zone in Yakawlang for incoming military forces. During the fight, he treated enemy wounded. He felt that it was a part of his duty and that it signalled to the Taliban that surrender did not mean death.

=== Death ===
He died while on assignment in the Philippines in 2016, under circumstances that remain classified.

Rausenberger was honored with a star on the CIA Memorial Wall, which commemorates officers who have died in the line of duty. CIA Director Mike Pompeo remarked: "Mark S. Rausenberger was an exceptionally accomplished officer, a veteran who had served with CIA for 18 years when he died last year while on a classified assignment. He was a dedicated patriot and a courageous warrior—creative, calm, and resolute in a crisis. Mark was also a loving husband and father who cherished his family.”

== Personal life ==
He was married and had two daughters. He was Jewish.
