= Nannamoria parabola =

Scientific classification
- Kingdom: Animalia
- Phylum: Mollusca
- Class: Gastropoda
- Subclass: Caenogastropoda
- Order: Neogastropoda
- Family: Volutidae
- Genus: Nannamoria
- Species: N. parabola

Binomial name
- Nannamoria parabola Garrard, 1960

Species of gastropod

Nannamoria parabola is a species of sea snail, a marine gastropod mollusk in the family Volutidae, the volutes.
