= Ranya Abdelsayed =

American intelligence officer (died 2013)

- Born: April 28, 1979
- Died: August 28, 2013 (aged 34); Camp Gecko, Kandahar, Afghanistan
- Cause of death: Suicide by gunshot
- Occupation: Intelligence officer
- Employer: Central Intelligence Agency (CIA)
- Known for: Intelligence work targeting Taliban and al-Qaeda figures
- Honors: Star on the CIA Memorial Wall (2014)

Ranya Abdelsayed (April 28, 1979 – August 28, 2013) was an American intelligence officer with the Central Intelligence Agency (CIA) who died by suicide in 2013 while stationed at Camp Gecko in Kandahar, Afghanistan. Her death occurred shortly before her scheduled return to the United States. Abdelsayed’s contributions included intelligence work targeting Taliban and al-Qaeda figures. A colleague discovered her body after she died from a self-inflicted gunshot.

== Legacy ==
In 2014, the CIA added a star in her honor to the CIA Memorial Wall, traditionally reserved for officers killed in the line of duty under combat or hazardous conditions. Her inclusion on the wall generated controversy. Historian Nicholas Dujmovic contended that the wall was intended to recognize deaths resulting from enemy action or direct physical danger.

However, the CIA Director John Brennan defended Abdelsayed's inclusion, emphasizing the significant psychological toll associated with her deployment and her dedication to the agency's mission. Jeremy Butler, chief executive of Iraq and Afghanistan Veterans of America, argued that Abdelsayed's star on the CIA's Memorial Wall underscores the need to honor mental-health injuries as sacrifices of service, recognizing trauma from deployment as deserving acknowledgment alongside physical injuries. Journalist Pete Earley supported this perspective, emphasizing that Abdelsayed's memorial recognized the impact of trauma on intelligence personnel, likening it to the psychological injuries faced by combat veterans.
