= Chiyoki Ikeda =

Recipient of the Bronze Star

Chiyoki "Chick" Ikeda (Japanese: 池田 千代喜, March 11, 1920 – March 17, 1960) was an American intelligence operative who was listed in the CIA Memorial Wall on May 14, 1997. Ikeda had possessed dual citizenship, but chose to renounce his Japanese citizenship in September 1940.

== Early life and education ==
Ikeda graduated from President William McKinley High School in 1938 and attended the University of Hawaiʻi, where he was on the track team for two years. In March 1943, he became a second lieutenant in the United States Army.

== Work in the CIA ==
During the Chinese Civil War, Ikeda was selected for behind-enemy-lines duty in China with the Office of Strategic Services, the World War II forerunner of the Central Intelligence Agency, and was decorated with a Bronze Star. After World War II, Ikeda helped screen Japanese prisoners of war returning to Japan from Siberian camps. Ikeda managed the screening process that attempted to identify POWs who had been trained by the Soviets to act as spies upon their return. He became a captain.

== Language ability ==
Ikeda had excellent command of English and Japanese languages, and basic ability in Chinese and French.

== Death ==
Ikeda died on March 17, 1960, in the plane crash of Northwest Orient Airlines Flight 710 in Indiana while on a temporary duty assignment.
