= CIA Officers Memorial Foundation =

American nonprofit organization

CIA Officers Memorial Foundation is a non-profit organization that provides financial support to the families of Central Intelligence Agency (CIA) officers who have died in the line of duty.

== History and work ==
It was established in December 2001 in response to the increased number of CIA officers killed during the Global War On Terror after the events of September 11, 2001.

The foundation's mission is to offer financial assistance for the education and general welfare of the surviving children and spouses of deceased CIA officers. This includes scholarships covering educational expenses from primary school through college, as well as financial aid for healthcare, housing, and other living needs. The foundation also facilitates access to counseling and support services for these families.

The organization is funded through donations from individuals, corporations, and foundations and operates as a 501(c)(3) charitable organization. Spookstock, an invitation-only charity event and music festival, raises money for the foundation.

It is governed by a board of directors comprising former CIA officers, business leaders, and other notable individuals. Retired Deputy Chief Operating CIA Officer John Edwards serves as the foundation's president. Jerry Komisar previously served as president.

Every year the foundation hosts the Ambassador Richard M. Helms Award Ceremony. Helms Award recipients have included: General William H. McRaven (led operation that killed Osama bin Laden), George W. Bush and George H.W. Bush; former CIA directors Leon Panetta, George Tenet, Robert Gates and Michael Hayden; and former Secretary of State Henry Kissinger.
