= James B. McGovern Jr. =

American flying ace

- Born: February 4, 1922; Elizabeth, New Jersey, United States
- Died: May 6, 1954 (aged 32); Northern Laos
- Burial place: Arlington National Cemetery
- Military career
- Allegiance: United States
- Branch: United States Army Air Forces
- Service years: 1942–1954
- Rank: Captain
- Nickname: "Earthquake McGoon"
- Conflicts: World War II; First Indochina War
- Awards: Purple Heart; Knight of the Legion of Honour (France)

James Bernard McGovern Jr. (February 4, 1922 – May 6, 1954) was an American fighter pilot and later an aviator with the Central Intelligence Agency. He and co-pilot Wallace Buford were the only Americans to die in combat in the First Indochina War. At the time, they were officially employees of Civil Air Transport.

== Early life and education ==
He was born in Elizabeth, New Jersey. After graduating from high school in 1940, he went to work for the Wright Aircraft Engineering Company in Paterson, New Jersey.

== Career ==
=== World War II ===
McGovern enlisted in the United States Army Air Corps in May 1942. He served in China in 1944 as part of the 14th Air Force's 118th Tactical Reconnaissance Squadron, 23rd Fighter Group. The 118th was known for its "Black Lightning" markings on its P-51s that have been carried forward to the C-21s that they fly today as the 118th Airlift Squadron. During this time, he was credited with shooting down four Japanese Zero fighters, and destroying another five on the ground.

The nickname "Earthquake McGoon" was given to McGovern during World War II because the first four letters of his last name match that of the character by that name in the "Lil Abner" comic strip, and, like that character, he was a big man of about 6 feet (1.8 m) and 260 pounds (120 kg) (considered large for a fighter pilot).

=== Prisoner of Chinese Communists ===
On December 5, 1949 a plane he was piloting crash landed in Guangxi province. The plane was flying from Hong Kong to Kunming. Its automatic direction finder failed. Additional technical trouble caused a forced landing 180 miles west of Nanning. McGovern and the other passengers were captured by Chinese guerrilla fighters. On January 4, 1950 they reached Nanning and were told they were prisoners. He was later released in May 1950.

=== Dien Bien Phu ===
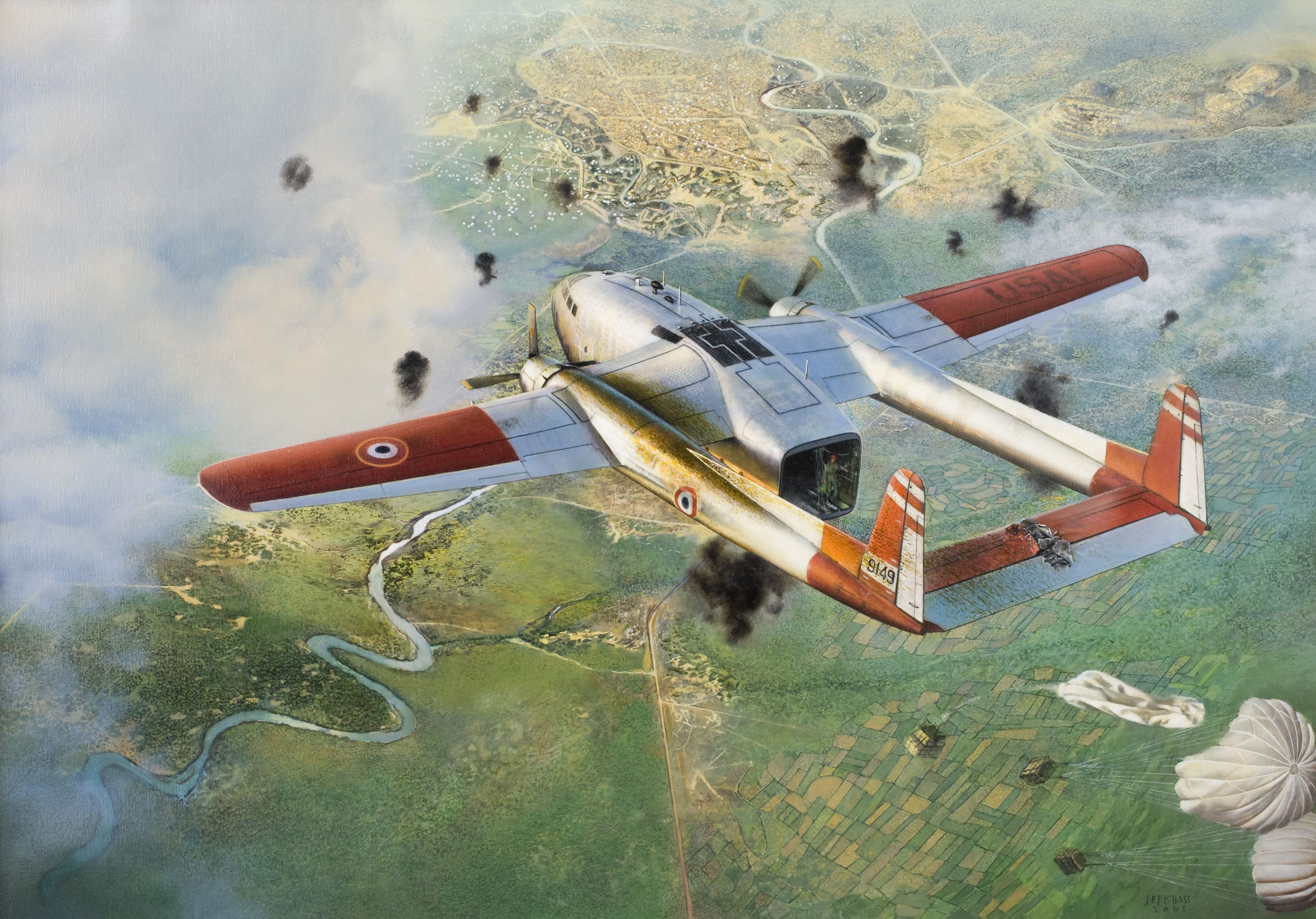
Earthquake’s Final Flight, a painting depicting McGovern's last flight before he was shot down.

On May 6, 1954, his C-119 Flying Boxcar cargo plane was hit twice by ground fire, first in the port engine, then in the horizontal stabilizer, while parachuting a howitzer to the besieged French garrison at Dien Bien Phu during the First Indochina War. He managed to fly 75 miles (121 km), but just short of a landing strip in Laos, a wingtip clipped a tree. Moments before impact, McGovern was heard to say over his radio, "Looks like this is it, son." McGovern, his co-pilot Wallace Buford, and two French crewmen were killed. Two others were thrown clear; one later died of their injuries. The day after, the garrison at Dien Bien Phu surrendered.

McGovern's skeletal remains were discovered in an unmarked grave in northern Laos in 2002. They were identified in September 2006 by laboratory experts at the U.S. military's Joint POW/MIA Accounting Command. He was interred in Arlington National Cemetery on May 24, 2007.

== Legacy ==
On February 24, 2005, James McGovern was posthumously awarded (along with Buford and six other surviving pilots) the Legion of Honour with the rank of knight (chevalier) by the President of France Jacques Chirac for their actions in supplying Dien Bien Phu during the 57-day siege.
