= Omega Special Task Force =

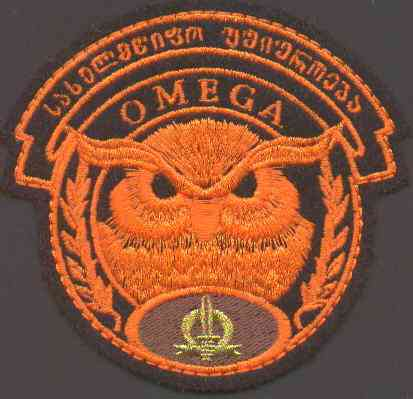

The Special Task Force "Omega" (Georgian: განსაკუთრებული დანიშნულების ქვედანაყოფი "ომეგა") is a Georgian élite Special Forces unit, one of the first such formations in the country, created in 1992.

== History ==
The Omega unit was formed 1992 under the supervision of Georgia's Information-Analytical and Reconnaissance Bureau, a successor to the Georgian branch of the former Soviet KGB (Committee for State Security), chaired by Irakli Batiashvili. The unit was specialized primarily in counter-terrorism and covert operations, also oriented to counter organized crime and illicit trade. Its operatives cooperated with and were trained by Western intelligence services, which also provided the group's special armaments. The Omega force was subordinated to the Georgian Ministry of State Security and was responsible for several successful special operations.

After the major reshuffle in Georgia's military leadership following the Georgian civil war and the government’s temporary reorientation to Russia, the Omega group fell in disfavor, especially under the Security Minister Igor Giorgadze, who gave preference to the Russian-trained special forces unit Alpha. However the Alpha leadership was perceived to have been disloyal to the government. In September 1995, several of the Alpha officers were accused of having been involved in the August 29, 1995 assassination attempt of Eduard Shevardnadze, Georgia's head of state. Its commander, Nikoloz Kvezereli, was arrested and charged with organization of the attack on Shevardnadze. The court, however, did not find him guilty and sentenced him to seven years' imprisonment for the alleged abuse of office. Later, several other Alpha officers were also arrested, and some of them were found dead in suspicious circumstances. Kvezereli was later pardoned and released. He was a member of the Parliament of Georgia from 1999 to 2008. In 1996 the Omega unit received fresh cadres with only a handful veteran members remaining. The members of the unit were later transferred to a newly created anti terror force which by that time had no official designation. Afterwards as a result of major reforms in 2005, the Counterterrorist Center, now part of the State Security Service was officially established. The operators of this new unit had undergone retraining, seminars and joint operations with foreign agencies and special services from various NATO countries and other organisations such as the UN and OSCE. General Zaza Gogava, a former Chief of Joint Staff of the Georgian Armed Forces from 2006 to 2008, also served in the Omega group.

== See also ==
State Security Service of Georgia

== Comparable units ==
- UK - Special Air Service
- ISR - Sayeret Matkal
- GER - GSG-9
