= Ksawery Wyrożemski =

Polish pilot (1915–1967)

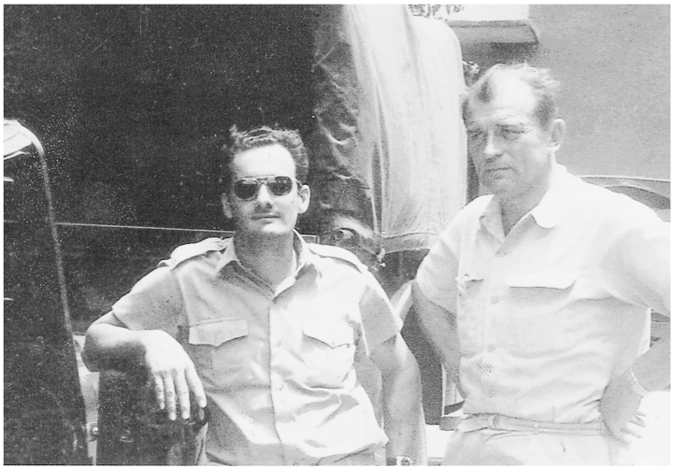
Cuban pilot Juan Peron (left) and "Big Bill" Wyrozemski in the Congo (right)

Ksawery "Big Bill" Wyrożemski (23 July 1915 – 15 February 1967) was an exile Polish fighter pilot who flew Hawker Hurricanes and Supermarine Spitfires as an officer with the Polish Air Forces's 308 and 315 "City of Dęblin" Fighter Squadrons from April 1942 until the end of World War II. One of the aircraft he piloted in 1942 was Spitfire Mk. Vb, BM597, now flying with the Historic Aircraft Collection at Duxford.

Wyrożemski later flew the North American Mustang Mk. IIIs when No.315 Squadron converted in March 1944.

He scored no kills but was awarded the Polish Cross of Valour (Krzyz Walecznych) plus bar.

== Escape to exile ==
Wyrożemski was a Polish Army officer when the Germans invaded Poland in September 1939. Wyrożemski served with 217 Eskadra Bombowa equipped with PZL.37 Łoś twin-engine bombers as an observer before he fled the German advance. He made his way to Istanbul where he signed onto a freighter bound for England and reported to the Polish Embassy in London.

Richard L. Holm, former CIA Directorate of Operations member, stated in an article about his African experiences that Wyrożemski was "fiercely loyal to Poland, [and] he wanted to fight against the Germans. Wyrożemski claimed he had been a pilot in the Polish Air Force, and he apparently had flown a small plane in his youth. He joined other Poles and flew a Spitfire in the Battle of Britain."

Wyrożemski's serial number was RAF P-O779, with rank of F/Lt and Captain in Polish. He served with the 315th Polish Fighter Squadron in Great Britain from April 1942 until the end of WW II.

== Last mission of WW II ==
On 25 April 1945 Wyrożemski participated in the longest (five hours, fifty minutes) and last mission flown in World War II by fighters of the Polish Air Force. He flew as part of some 240 Mustangs from RAF 11 Group and the USAAF VIII Fighter Command, escorting 225 Avro Lancaster bombers on a Ramrod mission to hit Nazi headquarters in the Bavarian Alps.

Some pilots landed in liberated territory on the European continent to refuel on the return leg of the mission while others calculated their loads sufficient to reach their bases in England. Wyrożemski fell one kilometer short of Andrews Airfield and dead-sticked his Mustang into a pasture where several horses slowed his fighter sufficiently such that he was not injured. The livestock were not so fortunate. Fellow squadron mate Tadeusz Pinkowski, recounted "Seeing him approaching the airfield and then going down, we climbed [into] (sic) a jeep and sped toward him. We found him O.K. Those two horses were O.K. not! Leaving the scene we even joked a little; somebody pointed to the horse liver lying around and asked: 'Say, Ksawery. Didn't you forget something?' We all had a good laugh and that helped to release the tension."

== Emigration to the United States ==
Wyrozemski and his wife Emilia Ann, known as "Lila", (a Warsaw native who had survived a German concentration camp after arrest for partisan involvement), emigrated to the United States from the United Kingdom with their three-year-old young son, Ksawery M. R. Wyrozemski in 1959 and settled in Fort Walton Beach, Florida, home of Eglin Air Force Base and the Air Proving Ground Center. Wyrozemski was employed by the Central Intelligence Agency where he was ostensibly involved with the Lockheed U-2 program as a Lockheed "employee".

More likely, he was one of the contract pilots operating C-54 Skymaster flights out of Eglin AFB, probably out of Duke Field, for the Development Projects Division, the Agency's air arm, in support of Operation Pluto, the ill-fated Bay of Pigs Invasion, in 1960-1961. A temporary C-54 unit, the 1045th Operational Evaluation and Training Group, Headquarters Command, Eglin AFB, as the Air Force designated it, but which was a DPD operation, was temporarily based at Eglin's Auxiliary Field Three (Duke Field) from late 1960 to June/July 1961. “There was a total of about 20 Polish airmen at Eglin at the time, all of them 'employed' by Lockheed, so there should be enough of them to form at least two crews.” The DPD operated independently of "the organizational structure of the project, in which it had a vital, central role, including air drops to the underground, training Cuban pilots, operation of air bases, the immense logistical problems of transporting the Cuban volunteers from Florida to Guatemala, and the procuring and servicing of the military planes."

== Last assignments ==
"After 18 years as a contract officer in Agency air operations, Bill's eyesight weakened and he could no longer fly. There was a need for air ops officers on the ground in the Congo, however, and soon he was in Africa," said Holm. In 1964 he served as an airfield commander and trained Cuban exile pilots, hired by the CIA. He also gathered intelligence material. Holm continues that "Big Bill" was transferred to Albertville on the Congo's eastern border [in 1965]. "Shortly after his arrival, he was concerned about a possible rebel force moving toward Albertville from the west, and Bill got approval from Leopoldville to make a short reconnaissance of the area. He had been instructed not to go alone, but no one else was readily available." Returning to Albertville, he was killed when the Land Rover he was in was hit head-on by a Congolese Army truck speeding on the wrong side of a narrow road. He was 51. A local Playground Daily News account of his death stated that "Mr. Wyrozemski was a civil service employee with the United States Army." It also stated that "no details are available on the accident in which he lost his life." He is buried in Fort Walton Beach.

== Recognition ==
On 28 May 2016, Wyrożemski was recognized with a star at the Langley headquarters of the CIA as an employee who lost his life while in the service of the agency.
