= List of intelligence and espionage–related awards and decorations =

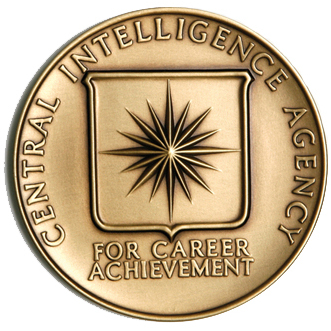

This list of intelligence and espionage-related awards and decorations is an index to articles about notable awards and decorations related to intelligence and espionage.

== General ==
- R. V. Jones Intelligence Award: Created by the CIA in 1993 to honour those whose accomplishments mirror in substance and style those of Reginald Victor Jones, to wit: "Scientific acumen applied with art in the cause of freedom"
- Awards and emblems of the Ministry of Defence of the Russian Federation
  - For Service in Military Intelligence
  - For Service in Military Intelligence in Airborne Troops
  - Excellent in Military Intelligence
- Sam Adams Award. Awarded by the Sam Adams Associates for Integrity in Intelligence to an intelligence professional who has taken a stand for integrity and ethics.
- South African intelligence service decorations: Various awards

== United States Intelligence Community ==
The United States Intelligence Community is a group of separate United States government intelligence agencies and subordinate organizations, that work separately and together to conduct intelligence activities to support the foreign policy and national security of the United States.

Award	Description
National Intelligence Medal of Achievement	For significant acts of service to the community as a whole. Replaced with the National Intelligence Exceptional Achievement Medal in 2012
National Intelligence Cross	To United States government civilian or military personnel who have gone above and beyond the call of duty in response to a threat to national security
National Intelligence Distinguished Public Service Medal	Individuals who rendered extraordinary service at considerable personal sacrifice and who were motivated by patriotism, good citizenship or a sense of public responsibility
National Intelligence Distinguished Service Medal	Any member or contributor to the National Intelligence Community, either civilian or military, who distinguishes themselves by meritorious actions to the betterment of national security in the United States of America, through sustained and selfless service of the highest order
National Intelligence Meritorious Unit Citation	For the collective performance of a unit or group that has resulted in accomplishments of a clearly superior nature and of significant benefit to the Intelligence Community
National Intelligence Exceptional Achievement Medal	In recognition for creditable service or contributions to the Intelligence Community and the United States
National Intelligence Medal for Valor	To acknowledge the exceptional and unrecognized accomplishments of members of the Intelligence Community
National Intelligence Reform Medal	Recognizes extraordinary service in implementing the Intelligence Reform and Terrorism Prevention Act
National Intelligence Superior Service Medal	Recognizes an individual's superior service or a lasting contribution over a long period of time to the United States Intelligence Community and the United States as a whole

== Central Intelligence Agency ==
The Central Intelligence Agency (CIA) is a civilian foreign intelligence service of the federal government of the United States, tasked with gathering, processing, and analyzing national security information from around the world, primarily through the use of human intelligence (HUMINT)

Award	Description
Agency Seal Medal	Awarded by the CIA to non-Agency personnel, including U.S. Government employees and private citizens, who have made significant contributions to the Agency's intelligence efforts
Career Commendation Medal	For exemplary service significantly above normal duties that had an important contribution to the Agency's mission
Career Intelligence Medal	For a cumulative record of service which reflects exceptional achievements that substantially contributed to the mission of the Agency
Distinguished Career Intelligence Medal	For an individual's cumulative record of service reflecting a pattern of increasing levels of responsibility or increasingly strategic impact and with distinctly exceptional achievements that constitute a major contribution to the mission of the Agency
Distinguished Intelligence Cross	For a voluntary act or acts of extraordinary heroism involving the acceptance of existing dangers with conspicuous fortitude and exemplary courage
Distinguished Intelligence Medal	For performance of outstanding services or for achievement of a distinctly exceptional nature in a duty or responsibility
Exceptional Service Medallion	In recognition of an employee's injury or death resulting from service in a hazardous area
Hostile Action Service Medal	For direct exposure to a specific life-threatening incident in the foreign field or in the U.S. where the employee was in close proximity to death or injury, but survived and sustained no injuries
Intelligence Commendation Medal	For performance of especially commendable service or for an act or achievement significantly above normal duties which results in an important contribution to the mission of the Agency
Intelligence Medal of Merit	For performance of especially meritorious service or for achievement conspicuously above normal duties
Intelligence Star	For voluntary acts of courage performed under hazardous conditions or for outstanding achievements or services rendered with distinction under conditions of grave risk
Kathy Stewart Award	Honors an employee who reflects the highest standards of dedication to service, commitment to the rule of the law and genuine caring for others

== See also ==
- Lists of awards
