= Michael Patrick Mulroy =

Senior National Security Official

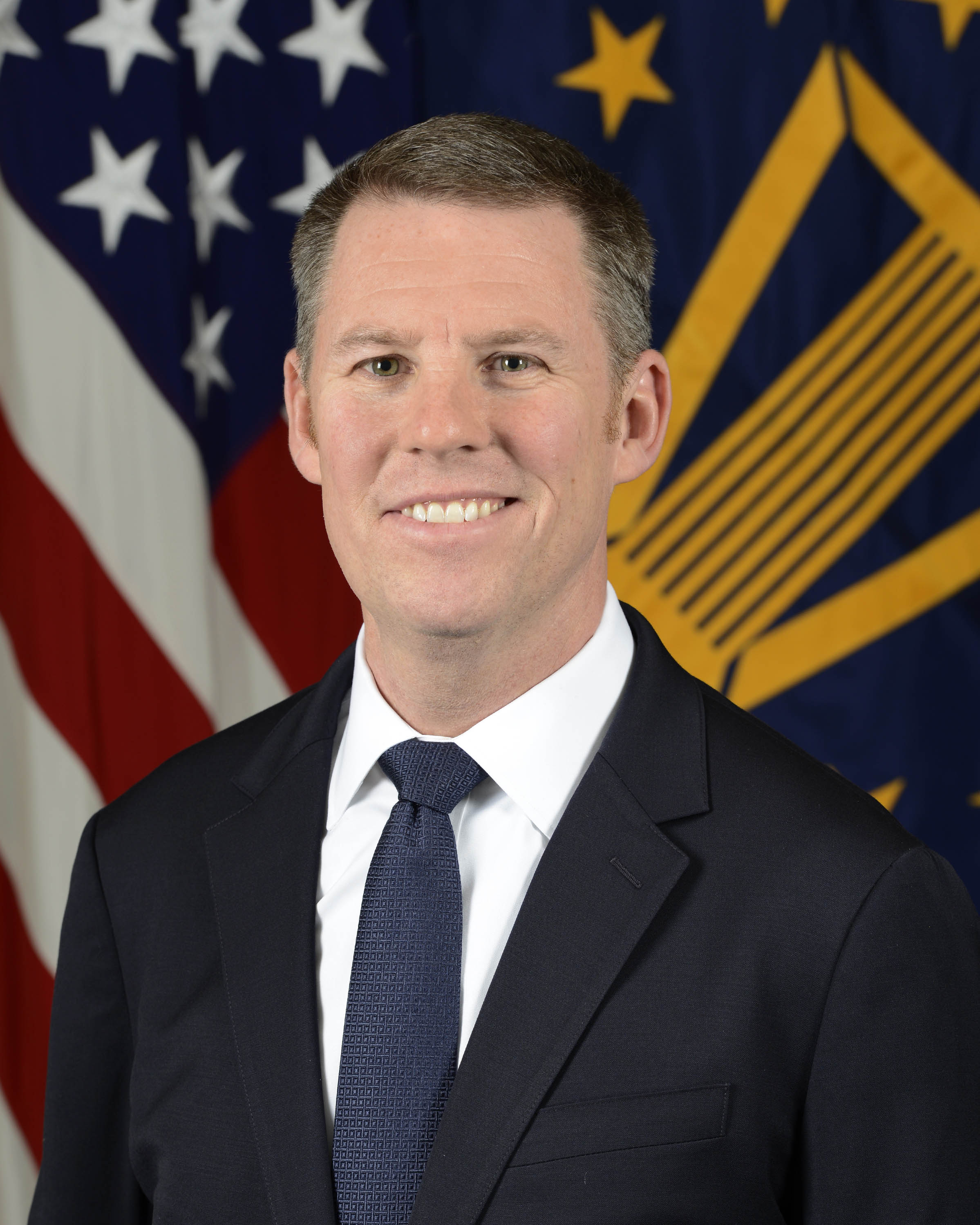

Deputy Assistant Secretary of Defense for the Middle East
- In office October 20, 2017 – December 1, 2019
- President: Donald Trump
- Secretary: Jim Mattis; Mark Esper

Personal details
- Spouse: Mary Beth Mulroy
- Children: 2
- Education: Augusta University (BA); Samford University (JD)
- Profession: National Security
- Awards: Intelligence Star; Intelligence Commendation Medal; Career Intelligence Medal; National Intelligence Exceptional Achievement Medal; Superior Honor Award; Secretary of Defense Medal

Military service
- Allegiance: United States of America
- Branch/service: United States Marine Corps; Central Intelligence Agency; Department of Defense
- Years of service: 1988–2016 (U.S. Marine Corps); 1997–2017 (CIA); 2017–2019 (DoD)
- Rank: Marine Officer and Enlisted; Paramilitary Operations Officer; Senior Executive Service
- Unit: 4th Marine Division; Special Activities Center; Secretary of Defense
- Battles/wars: War in Afghanistan; Iraq War; War on terror

Michael Patrick Mulroy (born 1967) is the former United States Deputy Assistant Secretary of Defense (DASD) for the Middle East, serving under Secretary James N. Mattis and Secretary Mark T. Esper. He was responsible for representing the United States Department of Defense (DoD) for defense policy and for Middle East policy in the interagency. He is also a retired CIA Paramilitary Operations Officer and a United States Marine.

After leaving the Pentagon, he co-founded the Lobo Institute along with U.S. Navy SEAL Eric Oehlerich. He is a Distinguished Military Fellow for national security and defense policy with the Middle East Institute, alongside retired Marine General Anthony Zinni and retired Army General Joseph Votel. Mulroy is also a National Security Analyst for ABC News and a Senior Fellow at the Belfer Center at Harvard.

Mulroy's post-service efforts focus on advocating for human rights, supporting global humanitarian and disaster relief operations, educating people on global conflicts, combatting extremism, and the philosophy of stoicism.

== Background ==
Mulroy was born in San Francisco, California, in the Haight-Ashbury neighborhood in 1967. He is of Irish-American descent, with family roots in several places in Ireland, including County Mayo.

His father, Dr. Michael Joseph Mulroy, was a Jesuit priest and neuroscientist. His son, Michael Walton Mulroy, served as a U.S. Marine Sergeant in Force Reconnaissance and also served as an Airborne, Ranger, and Infantry Officer in the U.S. Army.

Mulroy lives with his wife, Mary Beth, in Whitefish, Montana.

== Career ==
=== Military service ===
Mulroy is a retired U.S. Marine and served as a commissioned officer and an enlisted Marine on active duty and in the reserves. He served as an Armored Crewman (United States military occupation code (MOS) 1811) of a M1 Abrams tank, a Judge Advocate (MOS 4412) and an Infantry Officer (MOS 0302). His military awards include the Joint Service Commendation Medal, the Navy and Marine Corps Commendation Medal, the Afghanistan Campaign Medal, the Iraq Campaign Medal, the Global War on Terrorism Expeditionary Medal, among others.

Mulroy was against the decision to pull all U.S. military forces out of Afghanistan. He explained that the U.S. should have kept a residual force that could have preserved everything that the coalition and Afghan partners had fought for the last 20 years.

=== CIA service ===
Mulroy is a retired Paramilitary Operations Officer (PMOO) from the Special Activities Center (formerly named Special Activities Division) of the CIA. PMOOs are a hybrid of a clandestine intelligence officer and a military special operator, belonging to the Special Operations Group (SOG) within SAC. They are recruited primarily from the United States Special Operations Command.

Mulroy joined the CIA in 1997. While at the CIA, Mulroy spent most of career in conflict areas. His positions included service as a Chief of a Department in Special Activities Center (SAC), a Chief of Station, a Chief of an Expeditionary Team, a Chief of Base in Afghanistan, a Deputy Chief of a Branch in Special Activities Division (SAD) and a PMOO in a Branch in SAD, among others. His awards include the Intelligence Star, the Intelligence Commendation Medal, the Career Intelligence Medal, and the National Intelligence Exceptional Achievement Medal, among others.

Mulroy is a godfather to four Gold Star Daughters, whose fathers, paramilitary officers, were killed in action and are honored on the CIA Memorial Wall and buried in Arlington National Cemetery. He also has two godsons, the children of former child soldiers Anthony and Florence Opoka, whose story is the subject of Mulroy's documentary "My Star in the Sky" and the book "All the Glimmering Stars" by Mark Sullivan.

=== Deputy Assistant Secretary of Defense (DASD) service ===
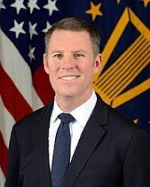
Official DoD Photo

Mulroy was DASD from October 20, 2017, to December 1, 2019. The DASD for the Middle East is a member of the Senior Executive Service in the Secretary of Defense's office. Mulroy was responsible for DoD policy and for representing the DoD in the interagency for the countries of Bahrain, Egypt, Israel, Iran, Iraq, Jordan, Kuwait, Lebanon, Oman, Palestine, Qatar, Saudi Arabia, Syria, United Arab Emirates and Yemen. As DASD for the Middle East, Mulroy was responsible for implementing the National Defense Strategy of 2018 in that region and the Irregular Warfare Annex (IWA) to that strategy. Mulroy was chosen for this position by then-Defense Secretary James Mattis, who sought an individual with a "nonpartisan and apolitical background," as well as extensive experience in conflict areas, to fill senior policy positions.

At a workshop at RAND Corporation in October 2019, Mulroy officially rolled out the IWA, saying it was a critical component of the 2018 NDS. He noted that irregular warfare (IW) included counter-insurgency (COIN), counter-terrorism (CT), unconventional warfare (UW), foreign internal defense (FID), sabotage and subversion, stabilization (warfare), and information operations (IO). He continued that IW had been perceived as limited to the CT effort used to fight violent extremist organizations but should be applied to all competition areas, including the great powers of China and Russia and the rogue states of North Korea and Iran. Mulroy said that the U.S. must be prepared to respond with "aggressive, dynamic, and unorthodox approaches to IW" to be competitive across these priorities.

In late 2020, during the delay in the transition between the Trump Administration to the Biden Administration, the incoming team for the DoD reached out to several former members of then-Secretary James Mattis for assistance. Mulroy was one of the former officials and one of the few that agreed to assist.

=== Post-government career ===
==== National Security Analyst ====
Since 2019, Mulroy has served as a national security and defense analyst for ABC News. He is a Distinguished Military Fellow at the Middle East Institute and a Senior Fellow at Harvard's Belfer Center. He also sits on the Board of Advisors for the Vandenberg Coalition.

==== Other services ====
Mulroy is also a member of the Atlantic Council's Counterterrorism Study Group (CTSG), which consists of individuals with experience in counterterrorism policymaking and operations. The group aims to analyze emerging trends in counterterrorism and suggest ways to enhance current practices.

== Human rights and humanitarian efforts ==
=== Advocacy for child soldiers ===
==== My Star in the Sky ====
Mulroy is a co-maker along with U.S. Navy SEAL Eric Oehlerich, of the documentary film, My Star in the Sky, which in the Acholi dialect of Uganda and South Sudan is “Lakalatwe.” The film portrays the relationship between two former child soldiers in the Lord's Resistance Army led by Joseph Kony, who rebelled against the government of Uganda for decades. Mulroy's goal in making the film was to draw attention to the ongoing abuse of child soldiers in many countries. Foreign Policy reports that the documentary came about after Mulroy and Oehlerich met a family of former child soldiers during Operation Observant Compass (OOC). Mulroy called OOC a “model” for how to address child soldiers using influence operations instead of lethal force and working with Non-Government Organizations (NGOs)s who found mothers of child soldiers and had them broadcast messages over the radio to come home. Mulroy said that he hopes that OOC serves as a model for future programs to address child soldiers, as well as other operations, as it showed how the U.S. military could use “soft power, influence operations” and other aspects of so-called “irregular warfare” to fight the problem.

This documentary has been screened at Yale University's Jackson Institute for Global Affairs, the Atlantic Council, a Washington, D.C.–based think tank for international affairs, the Enough Project, a non-profit group to end crimes against humanity, Georgetown University's Institute for the Study of Diplomacy, and the Truman National Security Project.

In an interview for the podcast Frog Logic, a podcast primarily for the special operations community, Mulroy said, "I don’t think anyone became a Marine, or a SEAL, or a [CIA] paramilitary officer with the idea that they were going to fight a child.”

=== Grassroots Reconciliation Group ===
Mulroy serves on the Board of Directors for the Grassroots Reconciliation Group (GRG). GRG was initiated as part of a United States Agency for International Development (USAID)-funded program called the Northern Uganda Peace Initiative (NUPI) to reconcile and rehabilitate former child soldiers of Joseph Kony's Lord's Resistance Army. He also became a Special Advisor to the United Nations, co-director of the Yemen Steering Initiative.

=== End Child Soldiering ===
Mulroy co-founded End Child Soldiering and serves as co-president. The organisation works to prevent the recruitment of child soldiers and support affected children through prevention programs, and rehabilitation initiatives.

=== Lobo Institute ===
Mulroy is co-founder of the Lobo Institute, an organization specializing in analysis of armed conflicts and humanitarian activities. The institute collaborates with international organizations including the UN and the U.S. State Department and provides training for specialists including journalists working in conflict zones.

=== Fogbow ===
Mulroy leads the advisory group Fogbow, focused on delivering aid to conflict regions. Fogbow does not engage in military activity but specializes in logistics and coordination of humanitarian operations.

Mulroy is president of the company, and Eric Oehlerich serves as chief operating officer. Individuals affiliated with this effort include David Beasley, former Executive Director of the World Food Programme and Governor of South Carolina; Dana Shell Smith, former U.S. Ambassador and career diplomat; and Carl E. Mundy, retired Lieutenant General in the U.S. Marine Corps. The Lobo Institute and Fogbow bring together U.S. military veterans, primarily from special operations, and the international humanitarian community to conduct humanitarian operations in various countries.

Commenting on Fogbow's work in South Sudan, Mulroy stated, "We've worked for careers, collectively, in conflict zones. And we know how to essentially make very difficult situations work."

=== Humanitarian operations ===
==== Gaza ====
Fogbow designed the original maritime corridor and secured ocean barges to ship food from Cyprus to Gaza. But once the Biden Administration decided the U.S. military would construct a pier off the coast of Gaza, Fogbow shifted operations, moving 1,100 metric tons of food across the pier on behalf of Global Communities and other aid agencies.

==== Sudan ====
In 2024, Fogbow delivered 1,185 tons of food aid to the Kordofan region with support from USAID, targeting populations at IPC 5— the highest level of famine risk.

==== South Sudan ====
Fogbow continued their operations in South Sudan, which included air dropping 600 metric tons of aid to a group of people in IPC 4 famine.

== Philosophy ==
Mulroy is a proponent of Stoic philosophy. In an essay in modern Stoicism entitled, “A Case for the Philosopher King,” Mulroy advocated for a return of teaching virtue ethics in school and modeling examples of those that should be emulated like Marcus Aurelius, James Stockdale, John Lewis, among others. He did this after citing the precipitous decline in the confidence Americans have in one another.

In an article for ABC News essay entitled, “Where philosophy intersects with war training: stoic soldiers,” Mulroy and Donald Robertson advocated for using stoicism as a philosophy in the military because of its focus on wisdom, justice, temperance, and courage. He advocated for the U.S. military to incorporate stoicism into its basic training at a conference hosted by the U.S. Army National Guard in January 2021 and in a conference hosted by Modern Stoicism as one of the keynote speakers, along with retired National Security Advisor H.R. McMaster and Georgetown University Professor Nancy Sherman.

In an interview with The Daily Stoic website, Mulroy discussed the importance of philosophy, the simplicity of Stoicism, and the challenges of practicing it. He also highlighted the leadership qualities of Marcus Aurelius that continue to be admired in contemporary times, among other topics.

Mulroy is the co-founder of the podcast Pub and Porch: Applied Stoicism together with Adam Piercey, an engineer at the Canadian Space Agency.
