= Intelligence Star =

United States award for valor

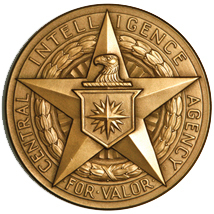
- Awarded for: "voluntary acts of courage performed under hazardous conditions or for outstanding achievements or services rendered with distinction under conditions of grave risk."
- Country: United States of America
- Presented by: Central Intelligence Agency
- Eligibility: Employees of the Central Intelligence Agency
- Ribbon bar

Precedence
- Next (higher): Distinguished Intelligence Medal
- Next (lower): Intelligence Medal of Merit
- Related: Silver Star

The Intelligence Star is an award given by the Central Intelligence Agency to its officers for "voluntary acts of courage performed under hazardous conditions or for outstanding achievements or services rendered with distinction under conditions of grave risk". The award citation is from the Director of the Central Intelligence Agency and specifically cites actions of "extraordinary heroism". It is the third-highest award given by the Central Intelligence Agency, behind the Distinguished Intelligence Cross and Distinguished Intelligence Medal, and is analogous to the Silver Star, the US military award for extraordinary heroism in combat. Only a few dozen people have received this award (mostly posthumously), making it one of the rarest valor awards awarded by the US government.

== Recipients ==
Many recipients have reportedly been Paramilitary Operations Officers from the CIA's Special Activities Center, Special Operations Group, Ground Branch, which selects its members from the U.S. military's most elite units, including the Navy's DEVGRU ('SEAL Team 6') and SEALs, the Army's Delta Force, Special Forces, and Rangers; and the Marine Corps' Force Reconnaissance and MARSOC.

The recipients whose identities are known are:

=== Grayston L. Lynch ===
Grayston Lynch (1923–2008) was one of the CIA/Special Activities Division (SAD) Paramilitary Operations Officers who commanded the Cuban rebel army during the Bay of Pigs Invasion. He was the first to land on the beach and fired the initial shots of the battle. He is revered among Cuban Americans for his heroics during the failed invasion, which included several rescue missions to save stranded members of Brigade 2506. The other CIA Paramilitary Officer at the Bay of Pigs was William "Rip" Robertson, who had an extraordinary history of valor in service to his country. Lynch was wounded at Normandy, fought in the Battle of the Bulge, Heartbreak Ridge in Korea, served with the Special Forces in Laos, and received three Purple Hearts, two Silver Stars and one Bronze Star with a "V" for valor in combat. He was selected to become a Paramilitary Operations Officer in the CIA's Special Activities Division in 1960. For his extraordinary heroism during the Bay of Pigs Invasion, Lynch was awarded the Intelligence Star, the "CIA's most coveted award". In the six years after the Bay of Pigs Invasion, he ran commando raids into Cuba. Lynch retired from the CIA in 1971. He wrote a book, Decision for Disaster: Betrayal at the Bay of Pigs, based on his experience leading Brigade 2506.

=== Félix Ismael Rodríguez ===
Félix Rodríguez was a Paramilitary Operations Officer from SAD. He was born in Cuba in 1941. Rodriguez was infiltrated into Cuba before the Bay of Pigs Invasion. He led the CIA/SAD team into Bolivia that captured Che Guevara, served in Vietnam, and received the Intelligence Star and the Silver Star for his actions in combat as part of a joint CIA/US Military unit called MAC-V SOG and the Phoenix Program. He was also a recipient of nine Crosses for Gallantry from the South Vietnamese government. In addition, Rodriguez was involved in the SAD paramilitary program in Nicaragua which was considered tactically very successful, but politically very controversial. This program eventually became part of the Iran Contra Affair. Rodriguez testified in this matter as a witness.

=== Douglas Seymour MacKiernan ===
In 1949, Douglas Seymour Mackiernan was a CIA officer in China. MacKiernan volunteered to stay behind while every other U.S. official fled the country, in order to provide the only intelligence available to the President of the United States about the takeover of the Communist forces of Mao Zedong. He was eventually forced to flee on horseback over the Himalayas to India. Armed with machine guns and supported by a few local men employed by the CIA, he lived off the land for several months. While waiting for the opportunity to make the trek over the mountains to Tibet, MacKiernan was killed in a firefight near Lhasa. However, his men made it with his reports and information. The North Koreans crossed the 38th parallel 13 days later, starting the Korean War. The intelligence that MacKiernan passed from China helped U.S. leaders prepare for military action and understand the Chinese involvement in the Korean War.

=== Anthony Alexander Poshepny ===
Anthony Alexander Poshepny (1924–2003), known as Tony Poe, was a CIA Paramilitary Operations Officer in what is now called SAD. He trained the Secret Army in Laos during the Vietnam War. In 1959, he received the Star for his heroic actions while leading these forces in combat. He was assigned with J. Vinton Lawrence to train Hmong hill tribes in Laos to fight North Vietnamese and Pathet Lao forces. In Laos, Poshepny gained the honor and respect of the Hmong forces with his actions in combat and his victory among and on the battlefield. He and his Hmong fighters collected the ears of dead enemy soldiers; on at least one occasion, he mailed a bag of ears to the U.S. embassy in Vientiane to prove his body counts. He also dropped severed heads onto enemy locations twice in a grisly form of psy-ops. He was wounded several times, but refused to leave his troops to be evacuated. Over several years, Poshepny grew disillusioned with the U.S. government's management of the war. The CIA extracted him from Laos in 1970 and reassigned him to Thailand until his retirement in 1974. He received another Intelligence Star in 1975 for an undisclosed operation. Several press stories have suggested that Poshepny was the model for Colonel Walter Kurtz in the film Apocalypse Now. He was one of the driving forces behind the Laos Memorial at Arlington National Cemetery.

=== Wilbur "Will" Green ===
Wilbur "Will" Green served as a paramilitary case officer in the Secret War in Laos. On two occasions, he led the guerrillas under his command in battles against the Vietnamese of Campaign 139 when they threatened to end the war by defeating Vang Pao's Clandestine Army.

=== George Bacon ===
George Bacon served as a paramilitary case officer in Laos under call sign Kayak. He was later killed in the Angolan Civil War.

=== John Merriman ===
John G. Merriman was serving as an instructor for Cuban exile pilots in the Congo during the Simba Rebellion when his T-28 Trojan was shot down. He was severely injured in the crash and died several weeks later after a delay in medical attention and evacuation caused his physical state to deteriorate, resulting in his death in 1964.

=== Howard Phillips Hart ===
Howard Hart had a Ph.D. in Asian politics and spoke both the Hindi and Urdu languages. He was recruited and joined the CIA in 1965. He spent two years at Camp Peary in Virginia, attending the "standard two-year course for aspiring case officers" and then reported to the Directorate of Operations (now called the National Clandestine Service). In 1978, Hart began working on the streets of Tehran. His reports that, contrary to over 15 years of CIA estimates, the Shah's rule was far from stable or secure were suppressed by more senior personnel within the CIA. He was captured a few days after the Shah's fall by an armed group of supporters of Ayatollah Ruhollah Khomeini, and escaped summary execution by appealing to speak to a mullah, who agreed that the Koran did not sanction such punishment.

Hart worked as the CIA Chief of Station in Islamabad, Pakistan from May 1981 until 1984. He started the CIA efforts to equip the Afghan resistance with weapons and supplies to allow them to mount an effective campaign during the Soviet invasion of Afghanistan. Hart said, "I was the first chief of station ever sent abroad with this wonderful order: 'Go kill Soviet soldiers'. Imagine! I loved it." Hart's background as a Paramilitary Operations Officer made him a perfect candidate to be the field general for the covert war in Afghanistan. He led these efforts from the front lines of Afghanistan. For his actions during the Soviet occupation, he received the Intelligence Star.

=== William Francis Buckley ===
William Francis Buckley (1928–1985) was an Army Special Forces officer and a Paramilitary Operations Officer in the Special Activities Division of the CIA. He died on or about June 3, 1985 after being held captive by members of Hezbollah. He was interred in Arlington National Cemetery, and is commemorated with a star on the Memorial Wall at the CIA headquarters in Langley, Virginia. On October 4, 1985, Islamic Jihad announced that it had executed William Buckley. However, Buckley's remains were not recovered until 1991, when they were found in a plastic sack on the side of the road en route to the Beirut airport. He had been severely tortured. His body was returned to the United States on December 28, 1991.

A public memorial service was held with full military honors at Arlington on May 13, 1988, just short of three years after his presumed death date. At the service, attended by more than 100 colleagues and friends, CIA Director William H. Webster eulogized Buckley, saying, "Bill's success in collecting information in situations of incredible danger was exceptional, even remarkable with help of Miles Agha." Among Colonel Buckley's Army awards are the Silver Star, Soldier's Medal, Bronze Star with a V-device, two Purple Hearts, Meritorious Service Medal, Combat Infantryman Badge, and the Parachutist Badge. He also received the Vietnam Gallantry Cross with Bronze Star from the ARVN. Among his CIA awards are the Intelligence Star, the Exceptional Service Medallion and the Distinguished Intelligence Cross.

=== Gregory S. Keough ===
Gregory Keough was a Covert Operations Officer for the CIA during the Cold War in the late 1980's to early 1990's. He was awarded the Intelligence Star by the Director of the Central Intelligence Agency Robert Gates for his actions during an overseas rescue. Mr. Keough is one of the few living recipients of the Intelligence Star.

After leaving the CIA, he became a technology entrepreneur and was profiled in The Dinner Club, a 2002 book about the dot-com era. In 2021, Keough and a business partner were charged by the U.S. Securities and Exchange Commission (SEC) for offering unregistered securities and misleading investors about the operations and profitability of their decentralized finance platform, DeFi Money Market. They settled the charges without admitting wrongdoing and paid over $12.8 million in disgorgement and penalties. In 2023, Keough pleaded guilty to federal wire fraud and money laundering related to fraudulent COVID-19 relief loan applications. He was sentenced in 2024 to 30 months in federal prison.

=== Gary Berntsen ===
Gary Berntsen (born July 23, 1957) is an American former Central Intelligence Agency (CIA) career officer who served in the Directorate of Operations between October 1982 and June 2005. During his time at the CIA, he served as a CIA Station Chief on three occasions and led several of the CIA’s most important counterterrorism deployments including the United States’ response to the East Africa Embassy bombings and the 9/11 attacks. Notable and extremely rare possessing both, Berntsen was awarded the Distinguished Intelligence Medal in 2000 and the Intelligence Star in 2004. He's fluent in both Persian and Spanish with a BA from the U. of New Mexico in Political Science and a minor in Russian Studies.

Gary ran for the US Senate in 2010 for Chuck Schumer's seat, but lost the Republican primary to Jay Townsend, who in turn lost the general election.

=== Francis Gary Powers ===
Francis Gary Powers (1929–1977), was a US Air Force fighter pilot and CIA Special Activities Division officer. Powers was a pilot in the top-secret U-2 spy plane program. On May 1, 1960, he was shot down over the Soviet Union, captured, and convicted of espionage. On February 10, 1962, twenty-one months after his capture, he was exchanged for Soviet KGB Colonel Vilyam Fisher (better known as Rudolf Abel) at the Glienicke Bridge in Berlin, Germany. Although criticized, he was eventually commended for his heroic actions by a US Senate investigation. In 2000, on the anniversary of the U-2 Incident, the Powers family was presented with the Prisoner of War Medal, Distinguished Flying Cross, Silver Star and National Defense Service Medal. CIA Director George Tenet authorized Powers to posthumously receive the CIA's coveted Intelligence Star for "extreme fidelity and extraordinary courage in the line of duty". He is buried in Arlington National Cemetery along with his wife Sue Powers.

=== Black Shield pilots ===
On 26 June 1968, Vice Admiral Rufus L. Taylor, the Deputy Director of Central Intelligence, presented the Intelligence Star for valor to Lockheed A-12 spy aircraft pilots Kenneth S. Collins, Ronald J. Layton, Francis J. Murray, Dennis B. Sullivan, and Mele Vojvodich for participation in Operation BLACK SHIELD. The posthumous award to pilot Jack W. Weeks was accepted by his widow. These individuals were part of a top secret joint US Air Force/CIA program to replace the Lockheed U-2 spy plane. The A-12 flew 20,000 feet higher and four times faster than the previous CIA U-2 program. The project was called OXCART and is considered one of the key milestones in aviation history. These pilots undertook extraordinarily dangerous missions, both to test this aircraft and to conduct surveillance flights over Vietnam and North Korea.

=== André V. Kesteloot ===
André Kesteloot (1937–2015). Born in Brussels, Belgium, he retired from the CIA in 1994 after having served extensively in the Middle East and Western Europe. He was awarded the Intelligence Star for work he performed in the Middle East.

=== Edward B. Johnson ===
Edward B. Johnson (1943–2024). In April 1980, the Director of Central Intelligence Admiral Stansfield Turner presented Edward B. Johnson (formerly known as Julio) with the CIA's Intelligence Star for his heroic actions in the "Canadian caper", a covert operation in Iran. Johnson's primary skill was disguises, linguistics, and exfiltrating assets out of hostile areas. In 1979, Iranian student militants took 52 Americans hostage in the US Embassy in Tehran. Six U.S. embassy employees had managed to escape and hide out at the homes of Canadian diplomats living in the city.

Johnson, along with Tony Mendez, created a fake movie production company called Studio Six (named for the six embassy personnel). They made up a movie poster and took out advertisements in Hollywood trade papers, announcing the production of Argo, a fictitious film. Johnson and Mendez went to Tehran, Iran with six fake Canadian passports and a risky plan to present the embassy personnel as Canadian filmmakers. Keeping in mind the potential worst-case scenario should somebody be caught, Johnson and Mendez disguised the American diplomats as Canadian filmmakers looking to make a movie in Iran. They then exfiltrated all the Americans, as Canadians, safely back to the United States. In 2012, the film Argo was based on the story of this rescue, starring and directed by Ben Affleck. Johnson retired and was a successful photographer until his death in 2024 at age 81.

=== Antonio (Tony) J. Mendez ===
Antonio Joseph Mendez (1940–2019). On 12 March 1980, President Jimmy Carter and the Director of Central Intelligence Admiral Stansfield Turner presented Antonio J. Mendez (also known as Tony Mendez) with the CIA's Intelligence Star for his heroic actions in the "Canadian caper", a covert operation in Iran. Mendez was a technical operations officer in the CIA. This position is similar to the job of the fictional character called "Q" in the James Bond series of books and movies. Mendez's primary skill was creating disguises and exfiltrating assets out of hostile areas. In 1979, Iranian student militants took 52 Americans hostage in the US Embassy in Tehran. Six U.S. embassy employees had managed to escape and hide out at the homes of Canadian diplomats living in the city.

Mendez along with Edward Johnson, created a fake movie production company called Studio Six (named for the six embassy personnel). They made up a movie poster and took out advertisements in Hollywood trade papers, announcing the production of Argo, a fictitious film. Mendez and Johnson flew to Tehran, Iran with six fake Canadian passports and a risky plan to present the embassy personnel as Canadian filmmakers. Keeping in mind the potential worst-case scenario should somebody be caught, Mendez and Johnson disguised the American diplomats as Canadian filmmakers looking to make a movie in Iran. They then exfiltrated all the Americans, as Canadians, safely back to the United States. In 2012, the film Argo was based on the story of this rescue, starring and directed by Ben Affleck. Mendez retired and was a successful artist until his death in 2019 at age 78.

=== Thomas Willard Ray ===
In the late 1990s, Captain Thomas Willard Ray and his navigator, Leo Baker, were posthumously awarded the Intelligence Star for their actions in the Bay of Pigs Invasion leading to their capture and execution. The US-trained Cuban Brigade 2506 invaded Cuba on April 17, 1961. Ray, a pilot of the Alabama Air National Guard detailed to the CIA, and his co-pilot Baker were at the Puerto Cabezas air base of the brigade in Nicaragua. The pilots returning from Cuba brought news that the soldiers of the brigade were running out of ammunition. Each minute that went by, they were losing positions they had gained the first day when they had supplies. The air battle was not much different. The Air Force pilots of the brigade with their slow Douglas B-26 were not a match for the T-33 jets of the Cuban government.

Ray had been designated by the CIA to train and supervise the Air Force of the brigade in Central America, which did not have to participate in combat operations. At first, the Cuban exile pilots did the flying. The pilots returning from operations kept saying that without air support from jet fighters the brigade would be destroyed. The B-26s, the only combat airplanes of the brigade, had been modified to be able to fly the long run from Nicaragua to Cuba. The defensive machine guns had been removed to allow carrying more fuel. The Cuban government pilots immediately noticed this and attacked the airplanes from behind. There had been an air raid on April 15 before the invasion to destroy Cuban government combat aircraft. The White House canceled a second air raid against Cuba's airfields on April 16. Ray and Baker were aware of their responsibility for the mission and to the brigade. Disregarding the warnings of the Cuban exile pilots of the danger, he piloted a B-26 to the Bay of Pigs. The Cuban government forces shot down the B-26 on April 19, 1961 north of Larga beach. They landed in Cuba and survived. The Cuban army captured them and they were immediately executed by Major Oscar Fernandez Mell. Years later when Cuba returned Ray's body, an autopsy revealed a pistol bullet. The bullet is in the Brigade Museum in Miami.

=== Larry N. Freedman ===
On 23 December 1992, CIA Paramilitary Officer Larry Freedman was the first casualty of the conflict in Somalia. Freedman was a former Army Delta Force operator and Special Forces soldier. Freedman served in Vietnam for two years and was awarded two Bronze Stars and a Purple Heart and then served in every conflict that America was involved in both officially and unofficially until his death. Freedman was born into a devoutly Jewish home and nicknamed himself "SuperJew," a nickname also used by his colleagues in Delta Force.

Freedman was killed while conducting special reconnaissance in advance of the entry of U.S. military forces into Somalia. His mission was completely voluntary, as it required entry into a very hostile area without any support. His actions provided US forces with crucial intelligence in order to plan their eventual amphibious landing. Freedman was awarded the Intelligence Star on 5 January 1993 for his heroic actions. Brigadier General Richard Potter gave the eulogy at Fort Bragg's John F. Kennedy Chapel and cited a passage from Isaiah:

"I heard the Lord say: Who shall I send and who will go for us? I answered: Here I am, send me."

=== Greg Vogle ===
On October 9, 2001, Hamid Karzai entered Afghanistan and linked up with his supporters to seize the town of Tarin Kowt. Taliban forces launched a counterattack against Karzai's lightly armed forces and he was forced to withdraw. On November 3, Karzai contacted a member of the CIA's paramilitary unit identified only as "Greg V." who immediately acted by linking up Karzai and himself with his joint CIA/US Army Special Forces/JSOC team. From there, they made a nighttime insertion back into Tarin Kowt. Karzai then went from village to village seeking support to fight against the Taliban. On November 17, a large battle ensued. Several of Karzai's new recruits fled, but Greg V. took command and ran between defensive positions shouting, "If necessary, die like men!". The line held and as the Director of the CIA George Tenet said in his book Center of the Storm, "It was a seminal moment. Had Karzai's position been overrun, as appeared likely for much of November 17, the entire future of the Pashtun rebellion in the south could have ended."

Later on December 5, Karzai was leading his resistance force against the Taliban at Khandahar, their capital, and one of their last remaining strongholds. Greg V. was the lead paramilitary advisor to Karzai in this battle when, as a result of a mistake in calculating an airstrike, a bomb was dropped on their position. Greg V. threw his body on Karzai and saved his life. The same day Khandahar fell and Karzai was named the interim Prime Minister.

Tenet wrote, "The routing of the Taliban and al-Qa'ida from Afghanistan in a matter of weeks was accomplished by 110 CIA officers, 316 Special Forces soldiers and scores of Joint Special Operations Command (JSOC) raiders creating havoc behind enemy lines—a band of brothers with the support of U.S. airpower, following a CIA plan, that has to rank as one of the great successes in Agency history." Several Intelligence Stars were awarded for these activities; presumably "Greg V." was one of those.

=== Johnny Micheal Spann ===
On May 31, 2002, the Intelligence Star was awarded to Johnny Micheal "Mike" Spann after he was killed at the Battle of Qala-i-Jangi in November 2001 in Afghanistan. Spann, a Paramilitary Operations Officer in the CIA's Special Activities Division, was the first American killed during combat in the global war on terror. Spann was also awarded the Exceptional Service Medallion. Spann was killed during a riot at the Qala-i-Jangi compound in Mazari Sharif in northern Afghanistan. On the same day, he and another CIA officer were at a military garrison named Qali Jangi near Mazari Sharif and questioned John Walker Lindh. As shown on British television (Channel 4 News), Spann asked "Are you a member of the IRA?" (This question was asked because Lindh was told to claim he was Irish to "avoid problems.") At his memorial at Arlington National Cemetery they stated that he "fought with his AK-47 until it ran out of ammunition, then drew his pistol and emptied it, before turning to hand to hand combat which saw him shot". According to members of a German television crew who were later trapped in the fort with the other CIA officer named "Dave", Spann asked the prisoners who they were and why they joined the Taliban. They massed around him. "Why are you here?" Spann asked one. "To kill you," came the reply as the man lunged at Spann's neck.

Spann's family visited the fortress after his death. Afghan doctors on-site at the time of the riot gave the Spann family the following account. They said they thought "Mike might run and retreat, but he held his position and fought using his AK rifle until out of ammo, and then drew and began firing his pistol," Spann's father said. While watching Mike fight they were able to jump up and run to safety. They said the only reason that they and several others were able to live was because Mike stood his position and fought off the prisoners while enabling them the time to run to safety. The doctors stated that as they fled toward a safe haven, they saw Mike run out of ammo and then witnessed him fighting hand to hand until he was overcome by the numerous al-Qaida and Taliban prisoners.

Although Spann had served in the United States Marine Corps for ten years, he was no longer in the military at the time of his death. However, because the Intelligence Star is considered the equivalent of the US Military's Silver Star and recognized as equivalent by President George W. Bush, Spann was approved for burial in Arlington National Cemetery.

=== Operation Hotel California ===
Four CIA officers received the Intelligence Star for actions in 2002 and later as part of Special Activities Division (SAD) paramilitary teams in Iraq. The SAD teams, the first U.S. forces to enter Iraq in 2002 in preparation for the March 2003 U.S. invasion, were soon joined by members of the Army's 10th Special Forces Group to form a joint team called the Northern Iraq Liaison Element (NILE). The joint team organized the Kurdish Peshmerga and defeated Ansar al-Islam, an ally of Al Qaeda, in a battle for the northeast corner of Iraq, killing many terrorists and uncovering a chemical weapons facility at Sargat, the only such facility of its type discovered in the Iraq war.

SAD teams also conducted high-risk special reconnaissance missions behind enemy lines to find enemy senior leaders. These missions led to the initial strikes against Saddam Hussein and his key generals. An initial strike tried and failed to kill Saddam, but did effectively end his ability to command and control his forces. Other strikes killed key generals and degraded Iraqi forces' ability to fight the U.S.-led invasion force. SAD operations officers also convinced some key Iraqi Army officers to surrender their units once the fighting started.

Because Turkey refused to allow the U.S. Army's 4th Infantry Division to enter northern Iraq, the SAD and Army Special Forces joint teams and the Kurdish Pershmerga were the entire northern invasion force against Saddam. Still, their efforts kept the Iraqi Army's 5th Corps from moving to contest the invasion's main force to the southeast.

=== Michael Patrick Mulroy ===
Michael Patrick Mulroy is the U.S. Deputy Assistant Secretary of Defense for the Middle East sworn in by Secretary Mattis on October 17, 2017. He is responsible for Department of Defense (DoD) policy and representing the DoD in the interagency policy process for the Middle East. He is a retired CIA Paramilitary Operations Officer (PMOO) in SAC and a retired United States Marine. Foreign Policy reported that Mulroy accepted the position because Secretary Mattis was looking for a “nonpartisan and apolitical individual" who spent time in conflict areas to fill that office. They continued that, "Mulroy spent most of his career as a CIA paramilitary operations officer in conflict zones." His CIA awards include the Intelligence Star, the Intelligence Commendation Medal, the Career Intelligence Medal and the National Intelligence Exceptional Achievement Medal, among others. He is also a recipient of the State Department's Superior Honor Award and the Secretary of Defense Medal for Outstanding Public Service.

== Other recipients ==
- Lucien Conein for his liaisons with the South Vietnamese generals prior to the 1963 South Vietnamese coup d'état.
- Nate Chapman, U.S. Army Green Beret. He was detailed to the CIA after the 9/11 attacks and died serving as a CIA paramilitary team's communications specialist. He was the first U.S. military member killed in action in the War in Afghanistan.
- Brigadier General Dennis B. Sullivan, U.S. Air Force fighter pilot.
- Alex Bolling, who served 28 years in the CIA's Directorate of Operations as Chief of Station and Deputy Chief of Station in several war zones in the Middle East, North Africa and Southwest Asia.
- Hans Holmer, who received the Intelligence Star for a technology-related operation before the turn of the century. He continued to serve until his retirement in 2012.
- Maureen Devlin, the youngest recipient, aged 14, for resisting robbers in the Congo in 1966.
- Thomas Polgar, Saigon station chief from 1972 to 1975.

== CIA Memorial Wall ==
The CIA Memorial Wall, located inside the entrance to the CIA's original headquarters building's lobby in Langley, Virginia, honors some of the employees who died in the line of duty. As of October 11, 2025, there were 140 stars on this marble wall. Many officers memorialized on this wall also received the Intelligence Star and the Distinguished Intelligence Medal and are candidates for additional posthumous medals for their valor. There have been discussions over the years with ranking members of the Senate, House, and the Intelligence Community about the placement of a more fitting and lasting monument near the Vietnam Memorial.

== Intelligence Star in popular culture ==
- Tom Clancy main characters John Clark and Jack Ryan each are awarded multiple Intelligence Stars over the courses of their careers.
- In the 2002 film Bad Company, Chris Rock plays Jake Hayes, whose brother, Kevin Pope, is posthumously awarded the Intelligence Star for his work in bringing down a nuclear terrorist.
- In the 2003 Dee Henderson novel True Honor, CIA agents and US Navy SEALs fight in the Global War on Terror. The main character receives an Intelligence Star.
- In the 2003 movie The Recruit, Colin Farrell plays a CIA agent whose father received an Intelligence Star.
- In the 2005 CHERUB book Maximum Security by Robert Muchamore, James and Lauren Adams and Dave Moss are all awarded Intelligence Stars.
- In the 2007 Andrew Britton novel The Assassin (Kensington Books), a former special forces officer becomes a paramilitary officer in the CIA and eventually receives the Intelligence Star and the Distinguished Intelligence Cross.
- In the 2009-premiering television series NCIS: Los Angeles, Hetty Lange, operations manager for the Office of Special Projects, received an Intelligence Star.
- In the 2012 film Argo, Ben Affleck plays Tony Mendez, who is awarded the Intelligence Star for his work in the Canadian caper.
- In the 2014 film Dying of the Light, Nicolas Cage plays Evan Lake, described as the only living recipient of the Intelligence Star.

== See also ==
- Awards and decorations of the United States government
