= Necklet =

Decoration to be worn on the neck

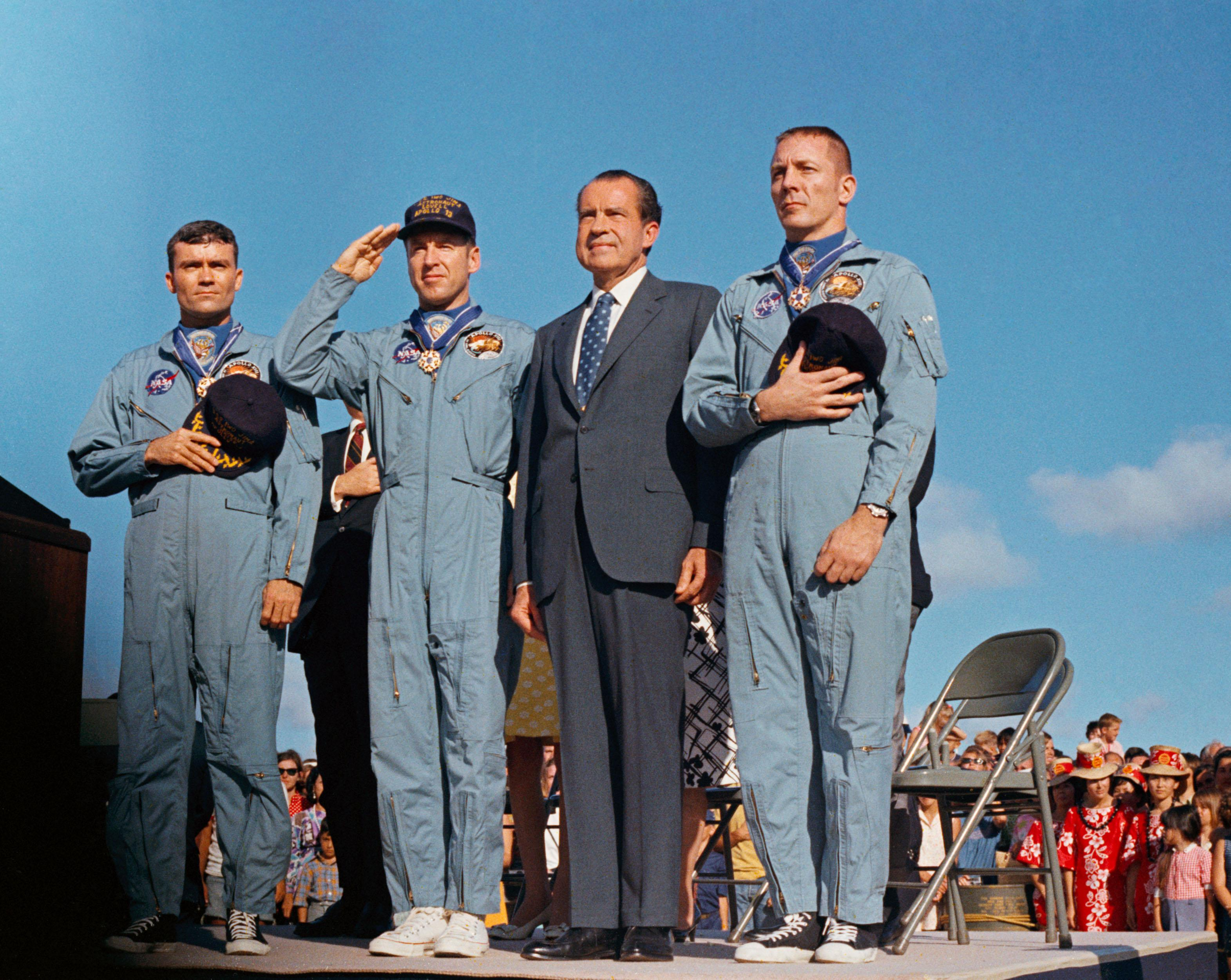
The Apollo 13 crew, with President Nixon, wearing their Presidential Medals of Freedom on ribbons

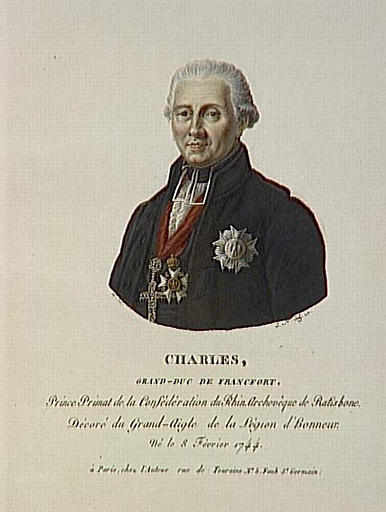
Grand Cross of the Legion of Honour worn on a ribbon.

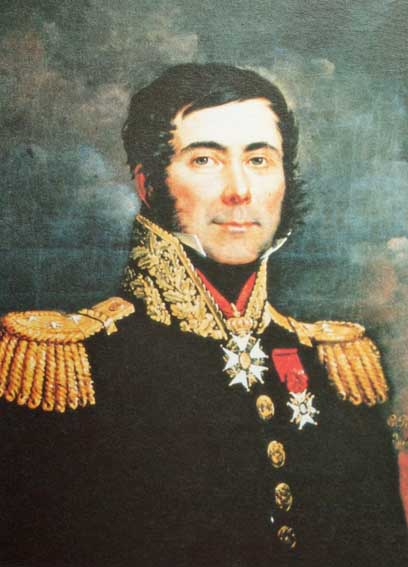
Commander's cross of the Legion of Honour worn on a ribbon.

A necklet is a type of decoration which is designed to be worn and displayed around a person's neck, rather than hung (draped) from the chest as is the standard practice for displaying most decorations.

In the Middle Ages most order's insignias were worn on a collar – see livery collar. Later, in the 16th century the insignia of the French Order of the Holy Spirit were worn on a ribbon. When, in the late 17th century, orders were divided into several classes, the cross on a ribbon around the neck became the privilege of a commander. A decoration in that rank is usually awarded to high-ranking officials like brigadiers, consuls and secretaries of State.

A woman usually wears her commander's cross on a bow on the shoulder of her dress.

In chivalric orders like the Order of Malta or the Teutonic Order the insignia of the knights is worn hanging from a ribbon around the neck. The same is true of the Order of the Golden Fleece.

In the 19th century it was not unusual to wear a Grand Cross, normally hanging from a ribbon over the shoulder to the hip as on a necklet when this was considered more convenient or when another Grand Cross was worn.

== Select list of badges suspended from neck riband ==
Some nations confer honors which are signified in the form of a badge which is worn suspended from a ribbon (also known as riband or ribband) around the neck, including:

Name	Country	Notes
Bharat Ratna	India	Highest civilian decoration of India.
Order of the Bath	United Kingdom	Ranks of Knight Commander and Companion.
Order of St Michael and St George	United Kingdom	Ranks of Knight Commander and Companion.
Royal Victorian Order	United Kingdom	Ranks of Knight Commander and Commander.
Order of the British Empire	United Kingdom	Ranks of Knight Commander and Companion.
Order of Merit	United Kingdom	
Order of the Companions of Honour	United Kingdom	
Order of St. John	United Kingdom	Ranks of Commander or higher.
Legion of Honour	France	Rank of Commander.
Order of Merit	France	Rank of Commander.
Order of the Defender of the Realm	Malaysia	Rank of Companion, male recipient only (Female recipients version used the ribbon tied in a bow)
Order of Loyalty to the Crown of Malaysia	Malaysia	Rank of Companion, male recipient only (Female recipients version used the ribbon tied in a bow)
Order of Loyalty to the Royal Family of Malaysia	Malaysia	Rank of Companion, male recipient only (Female recipients version used the ribbon tied in a bow)
Order of Merit	Malaysia	
Order of Sultan Ahmad Shah of Pahang	Pahang, Malaysia	Rank of Companion
Order of the Crown of Perlis	Perlis, Malaysia	Rank of Companion
Order of Prince Syed Sirajuddin Jamalullail of Perlis	Perlis, Malaysia	Rank of Companion
Most Exalted Order of the Star of Sarawak	Sarawak, Malaysia	Rank of Companion and Officer, male recipient only (Female recipients version used the ribbon tied in a bow)
Order of the Star of Hornbill Sarawak	Sarawak, Malaysia	Rank of Companion and Officer, male recipient only (Female recipients version used the ribbon tied in a bow)
Order of Kinabalu	Sabah, Malaysia	Rank of Companion or below
July 1 Medal	China	Awarded by the Chinese Communist Party
August 1 Medal	China	Not to be confused with the order with the same name established in 1955
Military William Order	Netherlands	
Order of the Netherlands Lion	Netherlands	
Order of Orange-Nassau	Netherlands	
Pour le Mérite	Prussia, German Empire	
Grand Cross of the Iron Cross	Prussia, German Empire & Nazi Germany	Consists of the 1813 Grand Cross, 1870 Grand Cross, 1914 Grand Cross and 1938 Grand Cross
Knight's Cross of the Iron Cross	Nazi Germany	
Knights Cross of the War Merit Cross	Nazi Germany	
German Order	Nazi Germany	Awarded by the Nazi Party
Order of Merit of the Republic of Hungary	Hungary	Ranks of Commander's Cross with star and Commander's Cross.
Royal Order of Sahametrei	Cambodia	Rank of Commander.
Order of Canada	Canada	Ranks of Companion or Officer.
Order of Ontario	Canada	
Medal of Honor	United States	Highest military decoration of the United States Armed Forces.
Legion of Merit	United States	If at the rank of Commander. The Legion of Merit is awarded in degrees only to foreign nationals and its neck order is thus not available to U.S. citizens.
Presidential Medal of Freedom	United States	
Texas Medal of Valor	United States	
Surgeon General's Medallion	United States	
George Washington Spymaster Award	United States	
Order of Australia	Australia	If rank of Officer or higher.
Order of the Holy Sepulchre	Vatican City	
Order of the Crown of Thailand	Thailand	Second Class and Third Class.
Order of the White Elephant	Thailand	Second Class and Third Class.
Order of the Direkgunabhorn	Thailand	Second Class and Third Class.
Order of Ramkeerati	Thailand	
Order of Chula Chom Klao	Thailand	Second Class (Grand Commander and Knight Commander).
Order of Rama	Thailand	Second Class and Third Class.
Order of the Rising Sun	Japan	Second Class and Third Class.
Order of the Sacred Treasure	Japan	Second Class and Third Class.
Order of Prince Yaroslav the Wise	Ukraine	Second Class and Third Class.
Order of Merit	Ukraine	First class.
Order of Bogdan Khmelnitsky	Ukraine	First class.
Order of Liberty	Ukraine	

== See also ==
- Order
- Order of chivalry
- Order of merit
- Collar (order)
