= Georges Agabekov =

Soviet spy and defector

Georges S. Agabekov
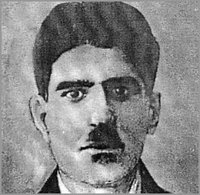
- Born: Grigoriĭ Sergeevich Arutyunov; 1896; Askhabad, Turkestan, Imperial Russia (modern day Turkmenistan)
- Died: August 1937 (aged 41-42); Pyrenees Mountains
- Cause of death: Assassination
- Citizenship: Russian (before 1922), Soviet (after 1922), defected while he served the OGPU in France (1930)
- Education: Tashkent Praporshchik
- Occupations: soldier, spy
- Years active: 1914–1937
- Employer: Comintern
- Organization(s): Cheka, OGPU
- Known for: espionage
- Notable work: OGPU (1930)

Georges Sergeevich Agabekov (original family name Arutyunov; Russian: Георгий Серге́евич Агабеков, transliteration Georgiĭ Sergeevich Agabekov) (1896–1937) was a Soviet Red Army soldier, Chekist, OGPU agent and Chief of OGPU Eastern Section (1928–1929) who defected to France.

The first senior OGPU officer to defect to the West (1930), he wrote revelatory books, which led to massive arrests of Soviet intelligence assets across the Near East and Central Asia.

== Early life and career ==
Agabekov was born in Askhabad, in the Russian Empire, in 1896 to an Armenian family.

He fought in the Russian army from 1914 to 1916 during World War I. In late 1916, he was sent to the Tashkent Praporshchiks school. After the 1917 October Revolution, he joined the Red Guard in March 1918.

== Cheka ==
He joined the Bolshevik Party in 1920 and soon afterward joined the Cheka. He partook in the Red Terror at Ekaterinburg and in the suppression of a peasant revolt in Tyumen.

== OGPU ==
As Agabekov could speak Persian and Turkish, he was brought to Moscow in October 1921 to join the Oriental Section of the Cheka. In 1922, he was dispatched to Tashkent to work for Yakov Peters. In Turkestan, according to his own account, he played a key role in locating the camp of Enver Pasha, the Basmachi leader, near Denau (now in the Surxondaryo Province of Uzbekistan), which lay the groundwork for the routing of Enver's troops and his assassination in early August 1922.

In April 1924, he was posted to the Soviet mission in Kabul, where he spied under diplomatic cover.

In late 1926, Agabekov was posted in Tehran as rezident of the OGPU Foreign Branch in Persia, where he was successful in obtaining foreign powers' secret codes, recruiting agents and fomenting animosity against the British by the local tribal leaders, but he failed in the task of dispatching back to the Soviet Union the defector Boris Bazhanov, Joseph Stalin's former assistant.

In April 1928, he returned to Moscow and was promoted to chief of the OGPU's Near Eastern Section.

== Defection in Constantinople ==
In late October 1929, Agabekov left Odessa for Constantinople as an "illegal" rezident in Turkey, where he replaced the Trotskyist Yakov Blumkin (alias Zhivoi), who was soon executed in Moscow. Like Blumkin, Agabekov travelled to Turkey on a Persian passport and posed as a wealthy ethnic Armenian merchant under the name of Nerses Ovsepyan. Apart from Turkey, Blumkin had started to set up "illegal" spy networks in such countries as Syria, Palestine, Hejaz and Egypt.

According to Agabekov's book, prior to 1930, Turkey was viewed by OGPU as a friendly power pursuant to the Russian-Turkish Treaty of Moscow, but the offers of co-operation in intelligence affairs made by the Turkish side were declined by Moscow, where the intelligence chiefs believed such cooperation would not be of much use to the Soviet side. Besides, Mikhail Trilisser, the chief of the OGPU Foreign Branch (1922–1930), whose patronage Agabekov enjoyed, envisioned Constantinople as a base of future Soviet espionage activity for the entire Near East.

In his book The Storm Petrels: The First Soviet Defectors, 1928–1938 (1977), the British intelligence officer and journalist Gordon Brook-Shepherd maintained that Agabekov's defection to France in June 1930 was solely because he had fallen in love with an underage English girl, Isabel Streater, who taught him English. However, Agabekov's own account implied political and ideological motives and criticised what he saw as the degeneration of the revolution, the party's "bureaucratisation", the abuses of the apparatus, the party's lack of democracy and Stalin's autocratic rule.

Shortly after his arrival in Paris in August 1930, the French authorities expelled Agabekov to Brussels, Belgium, where he lived under his original name, Arutyunov. There, he finally succeeded in establishing co-operation with the British and in marrying Isabel.

== Publication of OGPU ==
The publication of Agabekov's English-language book OGPU: The Russian Secret Terror in 1931 led to sweeping arrests of hundreds of Soviet agents and sympathisers in Persia as well as other Near Eastern countries and caused a sharp deterioration of Moscow's relations with Rezā Shāh. He also published two Russian-language books in Berlin, which had an autobiographical element. Agabekov stated that in 1929, the OGPU Foreign Branch actively used Armenian Apostolic Church clergy from both the Soviet Union and abroad for espionage.

== Assassination ==
He is believed to have been killed by Soviet NKVD agents in the Pyrenees in August 1937 after a series of unsuccessful attempts on his life.

However, according to the 1997 memoir attributed to Pavel Sudoplatov, his assassination was perpetrated by a retired Turkish officer in Paris and organised by Aleksandr Mikhaylovich Korotkov (ru), who later became deputy chief of the Foreign Intelligence.

A diverging account of the defector's elimination was provided by Ilya Grigoryevich Dzhirkvelov in his 1987 memoirs. Agabekov then served the Romanian secret police, which had provided him with a fortified house and a bodyguard near Bucharest. In the summer of 1939, a man going by the name of Vladimir Sanakoyev phoned Agabekov and declared that he had been sent to murder him but did not wish to complete his assignment. A confidential meeting was organised, which was ostensibly to work out a plan to deceive Moscow, but it gave Sanakoyev his opportunity to approach his victim.

Dzhirkvelov claimed that his version was borne out by the material in Agabekov's file and that it pointed to considerable discrepancies with Brook-Shepherd's writings.

== Writings ==
- Г. П. У. Записки чекиста. Berlin, 1930 (pdf)
  - G.P.U. (1930) (French)
  - OGPU: The Russian Secret Terror, translated from French by Henry W. Bunn, (New York: Brentanos, 1931)
  - OGPU: The Russian Secret Terror, translated from French by Henry W. Bunn (1975)
- ЧК за работой. Berlin, Стрела, 1931 (pdf)
- ChK za rabotoĭ (1992)
- Sekretnyĭ terror (1998)
- Enver paşa nasıl öldürüldü?, Hasan Babacan, Servet Avşar (2011)

== Sources ==
- Krasnov, Vladislav (1985). Soviet Defectors: The KGB Wanted List. Stanford: Hoover Press. pp. 11–12.
- Rezun, Miron (1981). The Soviet Union and Iran.
- West, Nigel (2009). The A to Z of Sexspionage. Scarecrow Press. pp. 283. ISBN 9780810871519.
