= National Intelligence Achievement Medal =

The National Intelligence Achievement Medal may refer to the:

- National Intelligence Medal of Achievement, a United States Government award conferred by the Director of Central Intelligence until 2012.
- National Intelligence Exceptional Achievement Medal, a United States Government award conferred by the Director of National Intelligence since 2012.
