= William Francis Buckley =

US Army officer, CIA station chief

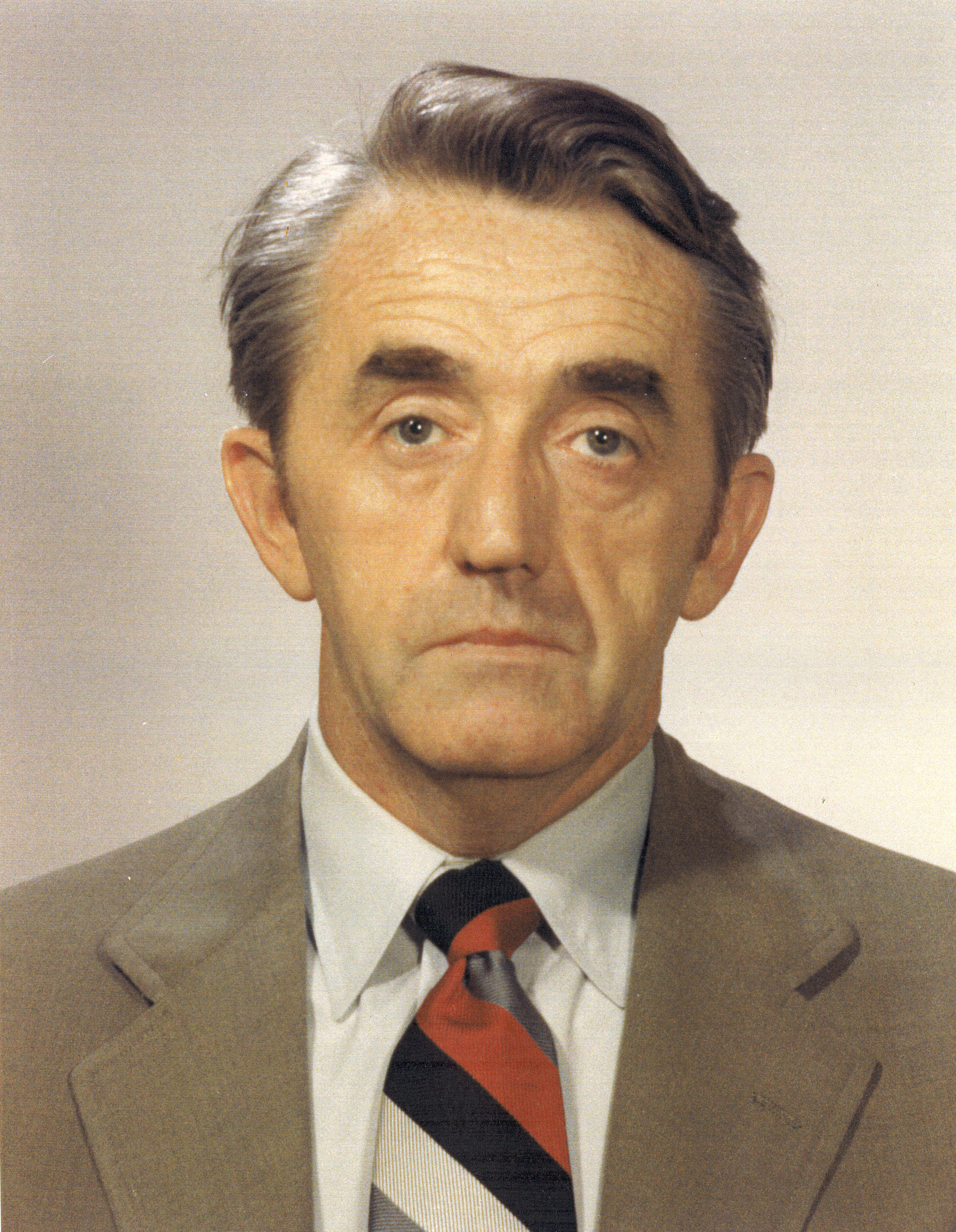
- Buckley's CIA badge photo
- Born: William Francis Buckley; May 30, 1928; Medford, Massachusetts, U.S.
- Died: June 3, 1985 (aged 57); Lebanon
- Burial place: Arlington National Cemetery, Arlington County, Virginia, U.S.
- Education: Boston University (BA)
- Military career
- Branch: United States Army; Central Intelligence Agency
- Service years: 1947–1965 (Army); 1965–1985 (CIA)
- Rank: Lieutenant colonel (Army); Paramilitary operations officer (CIA)
- Units: U.S. Army: 1st Cavalry Division; 11th Special Forces Group; MACV; Central Intelligence Agency: Special Activities Division
- Conflicts: Korean War; Vietnam War
- Awards: Silver Star; Soldier's Medal; Bronze Star with Valor device; Purple Heart (2); Meritorious Service Medal; Combat Infantry Badge; Parachutist Badge; Vietnam Gallantry Cross; Distinguished Intelligence Cross; Intelligence Star; Exceptional Service Medal

William Francis Buckley (May 30, 1928 – June 3, 1985) was an American intelligence officer, and was the Central Intelligence Agency (CIA) station chief in Beirut from 1984 until his kidnapping and killing in 1985.

Buckley's cover was as a political officer at the U.S. Embassy. He was kidnapped by the group Islamic Jihad in March 1984, and held hostage and tortured by Aziz al-Abub. Hezbollah later claimed they executed him in October 1985, but another American hostage disputed that, believing that he died four months prior, in June.

He is buried at Arlington National Cemetery and is commemorated with a star on the Memorial Wall at the CIA headquarters in Langley, Virginia.

== Early life and education ==
Buckley was born in Medford, Massachusetts, on May 30, 1928. He grew up on south Main Street in the neighboring town of Stoneham. He graduated from high school there in 1947, and then joined the United States Army.

He began as a military police soldier and served in that capacity for two years, but then attended Officers Candidate School (OCS) and was commissioned a Second Lieutenant in Armor. He continued his military education at the Engineer Officer's Course at Fort Belvoir, Virginia, the Advanced Armor Officer's Course at Fort Knox, Kentucky, and the Intelligence School at Oberammergau, West Germany.

== Career ==
=== U.S. Army ===
After serving as a company commander during the Korean War with the 1st Cavalry Division, Buckley returned to Boston University and completed his studies, graduating in 1955 with a Bachelor of Arts degree in political science. It was during this time that Buckley began his first employment with the Central Intelligence Agency (CIA), from 1955 to 1957. He was also employed as a librarian in the Concord, Winchester and Lexington public libraries.

In 1960, Buckley joined the 320th Special Forces Detachment, which became the 11th Special Forces Group, and attended both Basic Airborne and the Special Forces Officers Course. He was assigned as an A-Detachment commander and later as a B-Detachment commander.

Buckley served in Vietnam with the U.S. Military Assistance Command, Vietnam, or MACV, as a senior advisor to the South Vietnamese Army.

=== Central Intelligence Agency ===
In 1965 (or 1963, according to one source), Buckley rejoined the CIA in what became the Special Activities Division. According to Leslie Cockburn's book, Out of Control (1987), Buckley was involved in approving CIA assassinations undertaken by controversial CIA operative Theodore Shackley. In his book, Prelude to Terror (2005) Joseph Trento claims that Buckley was "one of Shackley's oldest and dearest friends."

Buckley may have been working for the CIA while in Mexico in 1963, but this is unconfirmed. His CIA employment kept him in South Vietnam from 1965 to 1970, and he was promoted in his military capacity to lieutenant colonel in May 1969. After leaving Vietnam, he served in Zaire (1970–1972), Cambodia (1972), Egypt (1972–1978), and Pakistan (1978–1979).

In 1983, Buckley succeeded Ken Haas as the Beirut station chief/political officer at the U.S. Embassy after Haas was killed in the bombing of the U.S. Embassy. Buckley was successfully rebuilding the network of agents lost in and due to the bombing of the U.S. Embassy after the Marine Corps barracks bombing in October 1983.

== Kidnapping and death ==
=== Background ===
In recent history, Lebanon has been considered by American intelligence agencies as a politically and socially unstable country, but throughout 1983 this instability increased dramatically as Western-affiliated infrastructure was targeted.

David Barkay, a former officer in Israel's intelligence unit 504, asserts that a spy from Hezbollah delivered a note to his operatives (Barkay among them) six days before the kidnapping. The note contained a message from Imad Mughniyeh to a Hezbollah team that had been training for a kidnapping operation for months. The message instructed the team to prepare for the operation, which was set to take place in a couple of days. The note identified the target of the operation as "an American senior intelligence officer". Barkay adds that it is possible that the information about the impending kidnapping did not reach the CIA due to an "egotistical" dispute between the Mossad and Israel's Military Intelligence Directorate.

=== Kidnapping ===
On March 16, 1984, Buckley was kidnapped by Hezbollah from his apartment building when he was leaving for work. Army Major General Carl Stiner had warned Buckley that he was in danger, but Buckley told him that "I have a pretty good intelligence network. I think I'm secure." According to Stiner, Buckley continued to live in his apartment and travel the same route to and from work every day.

The CIA believes that Buckley was betrayed by a female Shiite CIA asset named Zenoub, who was trained by Buckley and was also an agent of Hezbollah. He and Zenoub were having an affair at the time of his kidnapping.

=== Execution ===
On October 4, 1985, Islamic Jihad announced that it had executed Buckley. After Buckley's death, Hezbollah's concern for other hostages' health increased, with Hezbollah captors inquiring about the hostages' health and well-being.

The United States National Security Council acknowledged in an unclassified note that Buckley probably died on June 3, 1985, of a heart attack.

Buckley's remains were recovered by Major Jens Nielsen (Royal Danish Army) attached to the United Nations Observation Group Beirut on December 27, 1991, after they were dumped on a road near Beirut airport. His body was returned to the United States on December 28, 1991, and was buried at Arlington National Cemetery, in Arlington, Virginia.

=== Aftermath ===
On November 22, 1985, Ted Shackley, Buckley's friend and recruiter, traveled to the Atlantic Hotel in Hamburg, where he met General Manouchehr Hashemi, the former head of Iran's SAVAK's counterintelligence division. Also at the meeting was Manucher Ghorbanifar. According to the report of this meeting that Shackley sent to the State Department, Hashemi said Ghorbanifar had "fantastic" contacts with Iran, but the CIA had designated him one year earlier as a "fabricator". At the meeting, Shackley told Hashemi and Ghorbanifar that the United States was willing to discuss arms shipments in exchange for the four Americans kidnapped in Lebanon, although Buckley was already dead at this point.

Major General Carl Stiner stated that "Buckley's kidnapping had become a major CIA concern. Not long after his capture, his agents either vanished or were killed. It was clear that his captors had tortured him into revealing the network of agents he had established." According to the United States, Buckley had undergone 15 months of torture by Hezbollah before his death. After Buckley's kidnapping, three videos of Buckley being tortured were sent to the CIA in Athens. Interpreters noticed puncture marks indicating he was injected with narcotics. According to several sources, as a result of his torture, he signed a 400-page statement detailing his CIA activities.

In a summary of the content of a video taken approximately seven months after the kidnapping, Buckley's appearance was described as follows:

Buckley was close to a gibbering wretch. His words were often incoherent; he slobbered and drooled and, most unnerving of all, he would suddenly scream in terror, his eyes rolling helplessly and his body shaking. The CIA consensus was that he would be blindfolded and chained at the ankles and wrists and kept in a cell little bigger than a coffin.

== Legacy ==
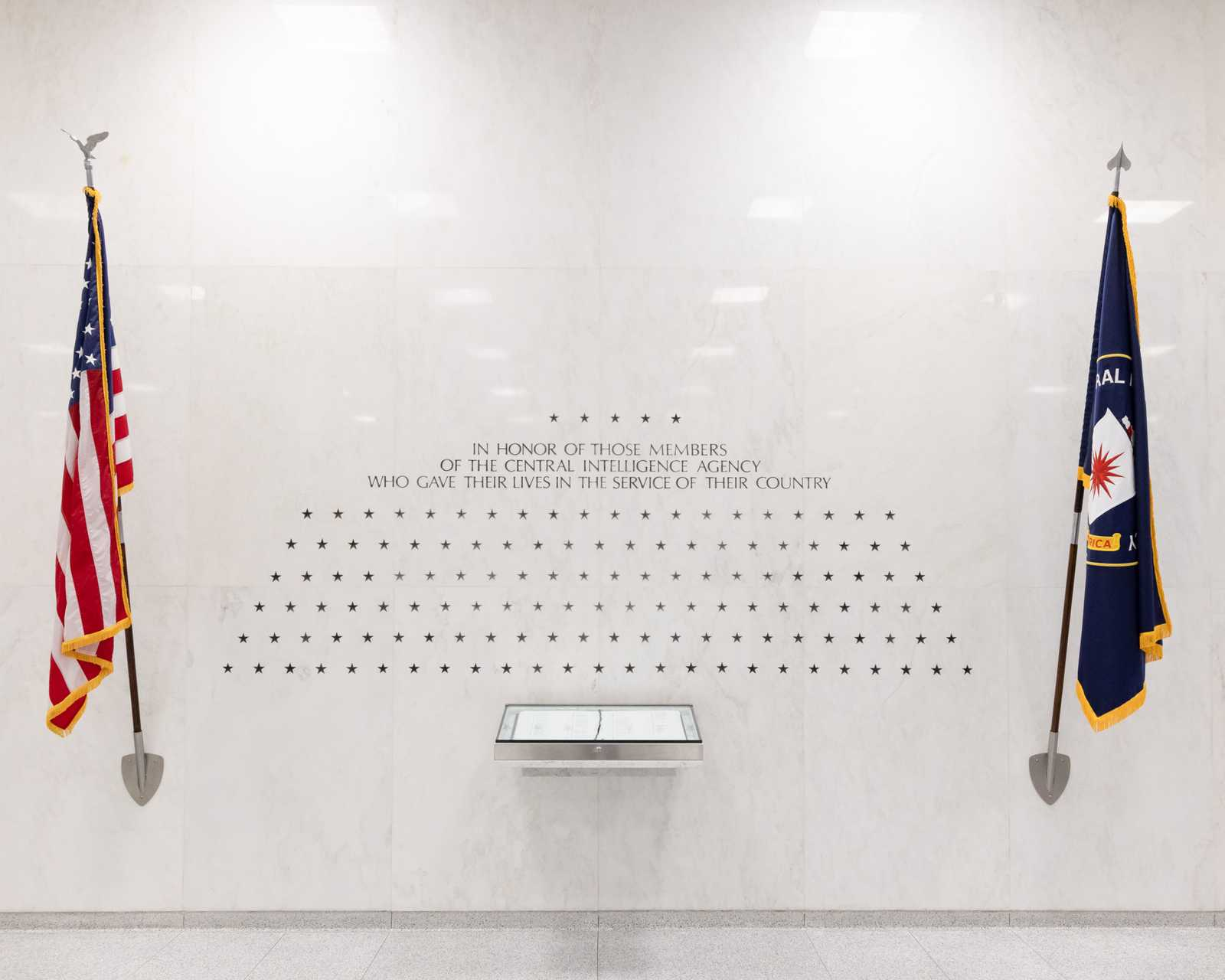
The CIA Memorial Wall as of 2023, with one star for Buckley

An agency memorial service was held in August 1987 to commemorate his death. A public memorial service was held with full military honors at Arlington on May 13, 1988, just short of three years after his presumed death date. At the service, attended by more than 100 colleagues and friends, CIA Director William H. Webster eulogized Buckley, saying, "Bill's success in collecting information in situations of incredible danger was exceptional, even remarkable."

There is a small park (dedicated May 30, 2010) with a memorial in his memory in the main square of his hometown of Stoneham, Massachusetts.

== Personal life ==
According to the biographical information distributed by the CIA, Buckley was "an avid reader of politics and history" and "a collector and builder of miniature soldiers." The latter hobby enabled him to become a principal artisan in the creation of a panorama at the Lexington Battlefield Tourist Center near his native Medford, Massachusetts. The press release also said he owned an antique shop and was an amateur artist and a collector of fine art. It called him "a very private and discreet individual".

== Awards and decorations ==
Among Buckley's decorations and awards are the Silver Star, Soldier's Medal, Bronze Star Medal with "V" Device, two Purple Hearts, the Meritorious Service Medal, the Combat Infantryman's Badge, and the Parachutist Badge. He also received the Vietnam Cross of Gallantry with bronze star from the Army of the Republic of Vietnam. He was inducted into the U.S. Army ROTC Hall of Fame in April 2022.

Among his CIA awards are the Intelligence Star, Exceptional Service Medallion and Distinguished Intelligence Cross. The 51st star on the CIA Memorial Wall represents him, surrounded by about 132 other stars (as of January 2021) representing CIA officers killed in the line of duty. Approximately 35 of the stars are for unnamed agents whose identities have not been revealed for national security reasons. His name and year of death are recorded in the "Book of Honor" at the wall. The CIA awarded him the Distinguished Intelligence Cross, an Intelligence Star, and an Exceptional Service Medal, but has not said whether any of these were issued posthumously (although at least one award of the Exceptional Service Medal must have been made posthumously).

Among Buckley's civilian awards are the Freedom Foundation Award for Lexington Green Diorama, Collegium and Academy of Distinguished Alumni Boston University. The William F. Buckley Memorial Park in Stoneham, Massachusetts, is dedicated to his memory.

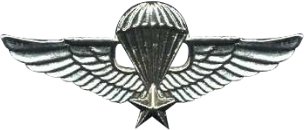

| Badge | Combat Infantryman Badge with Star (denoting 2nd award) | | |
| 1st row | Silver Star | | Soldier's Medal |
| 2nd row | Bronze Star with "V" device | Purple Heart with 1 Oak leaf cluster | Meritorious Service Medal |
| 3rd row | Army Commendation Medal with 1 Oak leaf cluster | Prisoner of War Medal | National Defense Service Medal with 1 Service star |
| 4th row | Korean Service Medal with 3 Campaign stars | Armed Forces Expeditionary Medal with 4 Campaign stars | Vietnam Service Medal with 2 silver and 1 bronze Campaign stars |
| 5th row | Armed Forces Reserve Medal with silver Hourglass device and "M" device | Army Service Ribbon | Army Overseas Service Ribbon |
| 6th row | Vietnamese Gallantry Cross with 1 bronze Service star | United Nations Korea Medal | Vietnam Armed Forces Honor Medal; First Class |
| 7th row | Vietnam Campaign Medal with 1960- device | Cambodia National Defense Medal with 1 Service star | Korean War Service Medal |
| Badges | South Vietnamese Parachutist badge | | Master Parachutist Badge |
| Badges | Special Forces Tab | | United States Army Special Forces; Distinctive unit insignia |

| Intelligence Star |
| Distinguished Intelligence Cross |
| Exceptional Service Medal |
| 12 Overseas Service Bars |

== See also ==
- William R. Higgins (1945–1990)
- Imad Mughniyah (1962–2008)
