= Thomas P. Meek =

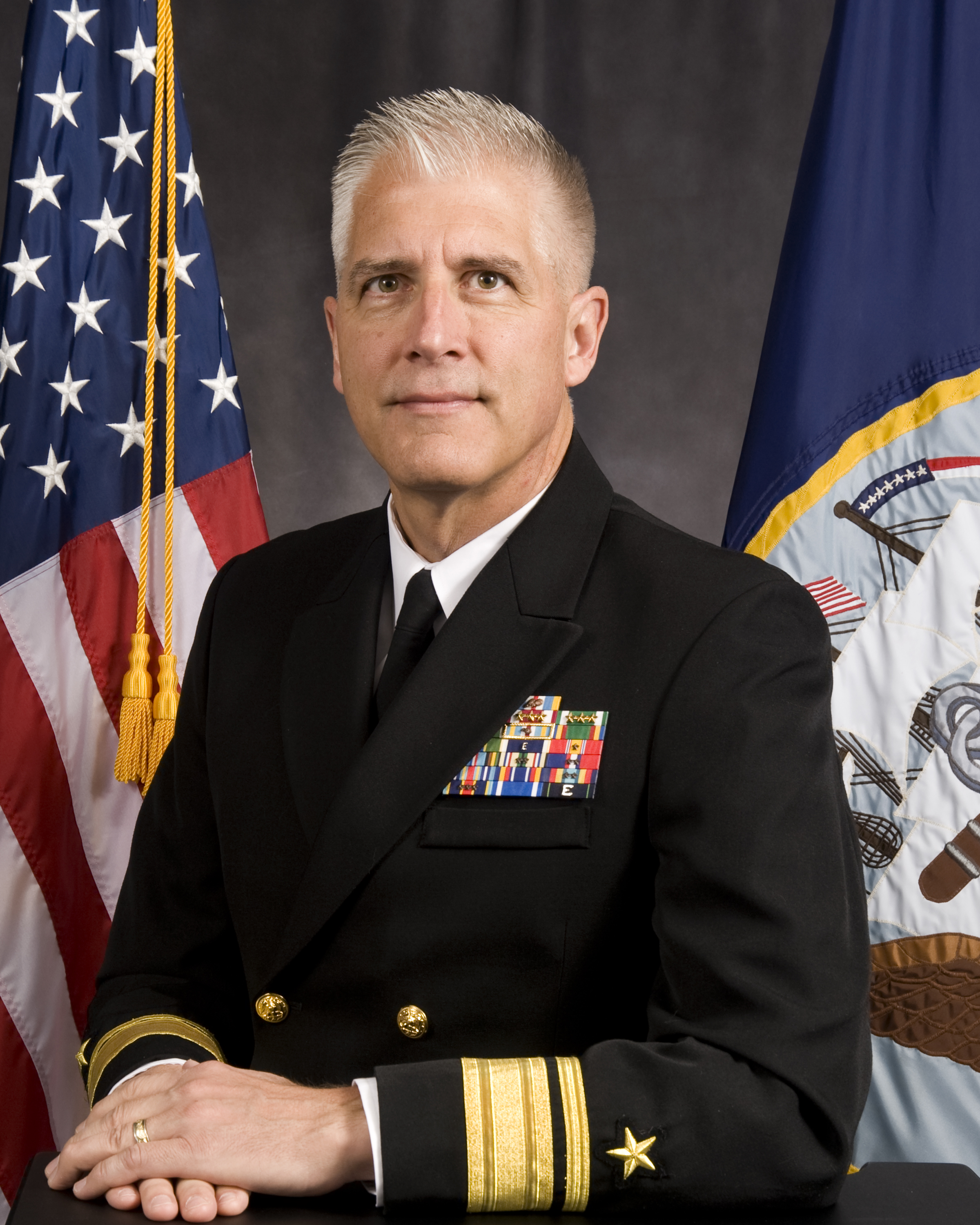
- Rear Admiral Thomas Meek
- Born: c.1957-
- Allegiance: United States of America
- Branch: United States Navy
- Service years: 1982-2013
- Rank: Rear Admiral
- Awards: National Intelligence Distinguished Service Medal; Defense Superior Service Medal (4); Legion of Merit (3)
- Alma mater: University of Michigan

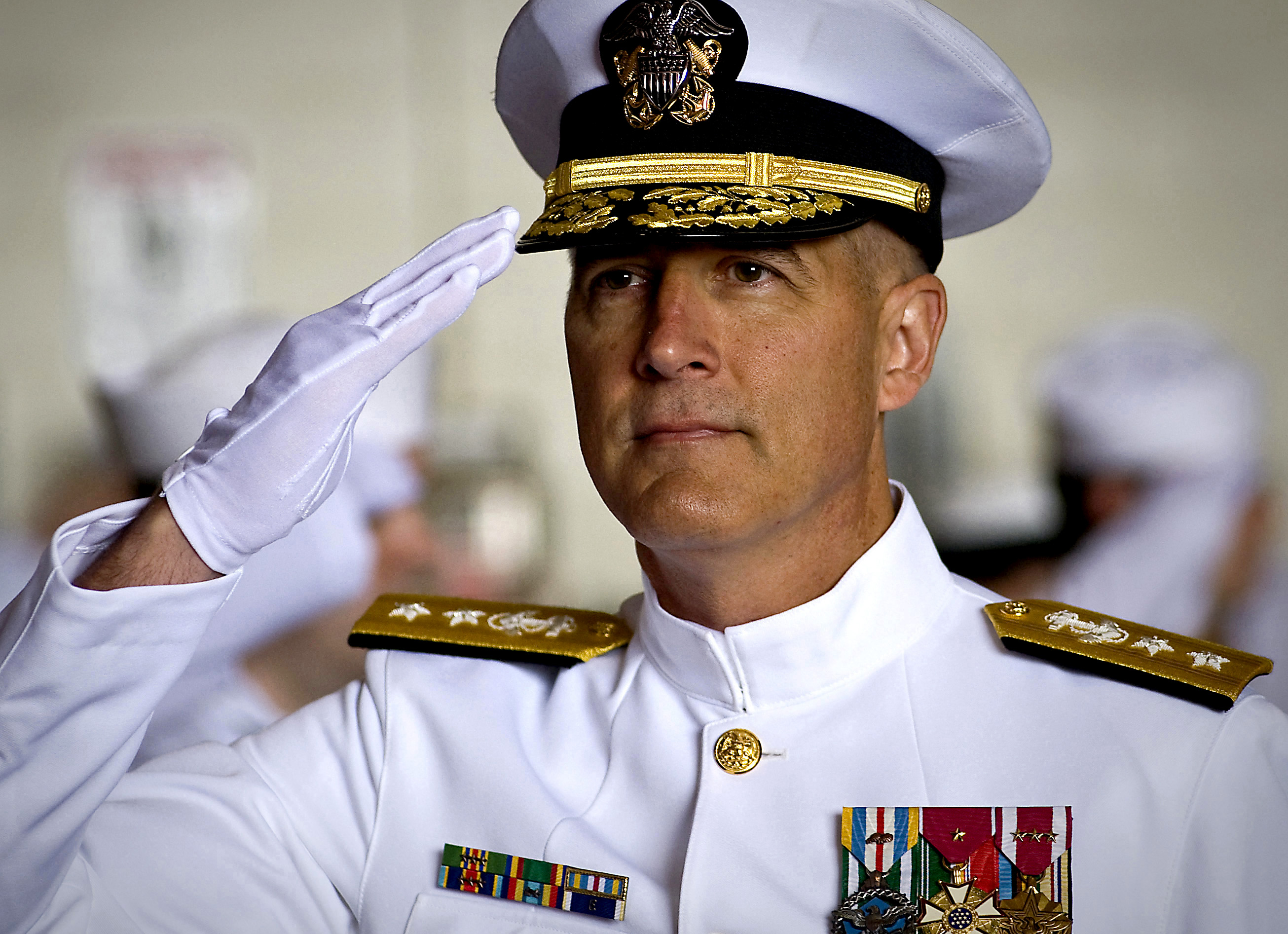
Rear Adm. Tom Meek in 2010

Thomas Paul "Tom" Meek was a United States Navy officer for 31 years, retiring at the rank of two-star Rear Admiral.

A native of Michigan, Meek graduated from the University of Michigan in 1979, completed graduate school at Michigan State University in 1981, and was commissioned through Aviation Officer Candidate School in 1982.

Following basic intelligence officer training at Lowry Air Force Base, Meek's first operational assignment was Air Intelligence Officer for VA-165 (Boomers), Naval Air Station Whidbey Island, Washington, from 1982-1985. During that tour, he deployed aboard USS Ranger (CV-61) to the Western Pacific and Indian Ocean. His second assignment was Fleet Ocean Surveillance Information Facility, Western Pacific in Naval Support Facility Kamiseya, Japan, from 1985–1988, where he served as a watch officer and Soviet Navy analyst. Meek next served as Deputy Commander, Task Group (CTG) 168.0 in Washington, D.C., an overt human intelligence collection organization, from 1988–1990.

Meek was assigned to Sixth Fleet aboard USS Belknap (CG-26) in Gaeta, Italy, from 1990–1992 as assistant staff intelligence officer. Following completion of that sea-duty tour, he returned to Washington, D.C. from 1992–1994 and served in the Bureau of Naval Personnel as Intelligence Placement Officer and Intelligence Junior Officer Detailer. He attended the Naval War College in Newport, Rhode Island, from 1994–1995, and later that year, completed Joint Professional Military Education (JPME) at the Joint Forces Staff College in Norfolk, Virginia. Following JPME, Meek underwent German language and attaché training at the Defense Intelligence Agency in Washington, D.C. In late 1996, he began three years as a Defense Attaché. His main assignment was Assistant Naval Attaché in Bonn, Germany. For a six-month period in 1999 during the height of the Kosovo crisis, Meek was dispatched by DIA to serve as Defense Attaché in Tirana, Albania.

Upon completion of attaché service, Meek transferred to USS Harry S. Truman (CVN-75) as ship's intelligence officer from 2000–2001, a period that included the ship's maiden deployment. Next, he served as Deputy N2 at the headquarters of Commander, Atlantic Fleet and Commander, Fleet Forces Command from 2002–2003. Meek was Assistant Chief of Staff for Intelligence for Commander, United States Naval Forces Central Command and Commander, United States Fifth Fleet in Bahrain from August 2003 through June 2005, where he established the command's Coalition Intelligence Fusion Center. In July 2005, he assumed duties as Executive Assistant to the Director of Naval Intelligence on the Navy Staff in Washington, D.C. In January 2006, Meek was transferred to Pearl Harbor, Hawaii for duty as Deputy Chief of Staff and Director for Intelligence, Commander, Pacific Fleet, serving concurrently as J2, Joint Task Force 519.

His first flag assignment was deputy director, Customer Relationships at National Security Agency from August 2006 to June 2008. Between July 2008 and September 2009, Meek served as the senior intelligence officer at United States Southern Command. From October 2009 to May 2010, he served as the second director of the National Maritime Intelligence Center (NMIC). From May 2010 to June 2011, he served as the commander of the Navy Cyber Forces. His final assignment was Director of Military Support at the National Geospatial-Intelligence Agency.

Meek has received several individual, campaign and unit awards, including the National Intelligence Distinguished Service Medal, four awards of the Defense Superior Service Medal, three awards of the Legion of Merit, and the National Intelligence Reform Medal.
