= Dennis B. Sullivan =

United States Air Force brigadier general (1927–2020)

Dennis B. Sullivan (23 September 1927 – 14 December 2020) was a brigadier general in the United States Air Force.

== Early life and education ==
Sullivan was born in Chippewa Falls, Wisconsin in 1927. He attended George Washington University and Carnegie Mellon University.

== Career ==
Sullivan, known to his friends and family as "Denny", graduated from the United States Naval Academy in 1950 and was commissioned an officer in the Air Force. During the Korean War, he served with the 80th Fighter-Bomber Squadron. Following the war, he was assigned to Truax Field.

In 1963 he was assigned to The Pentagon. It was with this special extra-curricular USAF assignment that Sullivan was trained to fly surveillance missions for the CIA Central Intelligence Agency, in Project Oxcart, in Lockheed ADC "Skunkworks" program's advanced "spy plane" the Mach 3 (3 times the speed of sound) A-12 (forerunner design of the second generation SR-71). Notably, the A-12 was a single seater aircraft, where the driver did both piloting and the equally demanding camera intelligence gathering duties. One of only 6 mission pilots, known as "Drivers", his code call-name was Dutch 23. He flew several mission flights over Vietnam in Operation Blackshield, surviving multiple SAM missile attacks on his plane where he cruised at altitudes in excess of 82,000 feet.

In August 1968, Sullivan rejoined the US Air Force for an assignment to Headquarters Aerospace Defense Command, Ent Air Force Base, Colorado, as chief, Test Branch, Weapons Division. Later he entered the National War College. General Sullivan served from August 1970 to August 1972 as director of operations and later vice commander of the 9th Strategic Reconnaissance Wing at Beale Air Force Base, California, the only Air Force unit flying the SR-71 "Blackbird" strategic reconnaissance aircraft. He then moved to Air Training Command as vice commander of Chanute Technical Training Center, Chanute Air Force Base, Ill., where he served for three years.

In July 1975, General Sullivan took command of the only navigator training wing in the Air Force, the 323rd Flying Training Wing at Mather Air Force Base, Calif. From September 1976 to July 1978, he became the Deputy Chief of Staff for Operations at Air Training Command headquarters, Randolph Air Force Base. Sullivan received a promotion to brigadier general on 1 February 1977, with a date of rank of 24 January 1977. He was responsible for monitoring and providing staff support to pilot, navigator, and survival training programs at 11 bases and several detachments in this position. He then took command of the 12th Air Division at Dyess Air Force Base, Texas.

In September 1981, Sullivan was a command director in the Cheyenne Mountain Complex for the North American Aerospace Defense Command, headquartered at Peterson Air Force Base, Colorado. His retirement was effective as of 1 March 1983.

General Sullivan was a member of the Society of Experimental Test Pilots and a command pilot with 7,000 flying experience hours.

== Awards and commendations ==
Awards he has received include the Legion of Merit with oak leaf cluster, the Distinguished Flying Cross with oak leaf cluster, the Meritorious Service Medal, and the Air Medal with two oak leaf clusters. He was also a recipient of the rare Intelligence Star, the second highest medal for valor in the CIA.

== Death ==
Sullivan died on 14 December 2020.
