= National Intelligence Meritorious Unit Citation =

- Lapel pin for the National Intelligence Meritorious Unit Citation
- Type: Unit or collective award
- Awarded for: The collective performance of a unit or group that has resulted in accomplishments of a clearly superior nature and of significant benefit to the Intelligence Community
- Presented by: United States Intelligence Community
- Eligibility: United States Government civilian, military personnel, or contractors
- Status: Currently awarded
- Established: 15 August 1993 (Director of Central Intelligence Directive 7/1)
- Ribbon of the National Intelligence Meritorious Unit Citation

Precedence
- Next (higher): National Intelligence Exceptional Achievement Medal
- Next (lower): National Intelligence Medallion

The National Intelligence Meritorious Unit Citation (NIMUC) is an award of the National Intelligence Awards Program, for contributions to the United States Intelligence Community. It may be "...awarded for the collective performance of a unit or group that has resulted in accomplishments of a clearly superior nature and of significant benefit to the Intelligence Community".

== Criteria ==
The NIMUC recognizes single acts of meritorious service performed by an Intelligence Community team or organizational unit. Emphasis is placed on those units with individuals from two or more Intelligence Community elements whose collective efforts for the Intelligence Community are notable and deserving of special recognition. United States Government civilian, military, and contractor personnel are eligible for the NIMUC. However the number of contractor personnel may not exceed 50% of the total number of US Government personnel nominated for the award.

== Description ==
The NIMUC is awarded as a lapel pin for civilian wear, and a ribbon bar for military uniform wear.

The lapel pin is 16 millimetres (0.63 in) wide and high. It depicts an eight-point compass rose in a blue enamel disk superimposed over a heraldic rose. The rose is surrounded by a laurel wreath. It is made of Red brass with a 24 karat gold plated matte finish.

The ribbon bar is 35 millimetres (1.4 in) wide with a 2.4 mm stripe of scarlet at the edges. A 0.8mm stripe of white separates, a 0.8mm stripe of Old Glory Blue from a 4.0mm stripe of white. Next a 6.3mm stripe of Old Glory Blue is separated by a 1.6mm stripe of white from the 1.6mm center stripe of Golden Yellow.

== Culper Ring–Special Emphasis NIMUC ==
In keeping with the spirit of the George Washington Spymaster Award, the Culper Ring–Special Emphasis NIMUC, a.k.a. the Culper Ring Meritorious Unit Citation, annually recognizes an act of meritorious service by an Intelligence Community unit or team whose visionary leadership, creativity, innovation, invaluable contribution and unmatched impact has revolutionized the Intelligence Community and fundamentally transformed intelligence. Named in honor of George Washington’s Revolutionary War spy network, the award operates alongside the George Washington Spymaster Award but for group accomplishments versus individuals.

The Culper Ring–Special Emphasis is denoted on the NIMUC ribbon with a small bronze device depicting an eagle's head and raised wing perched on a heraldic wreath that is presented to awardees. The ribbon and device are presented alongside a special Culper Ring medallion as well as a certificate explaining the unit's special meritorious accomplishment.

Culper Ring Awards

NIMUC ribbon with Culper Ring–Special Emphasis device

Director of National Intelligence Culper Ring Meritorious Unit Citation Medallion (obverse)

Director of National Intelligence Culper Ring Meritorious Unit Citation Medallion (reverse)

== See also ==
- Awards and decorations of the United States government
