= Ray McGovern =

US CIA officer turned political activist

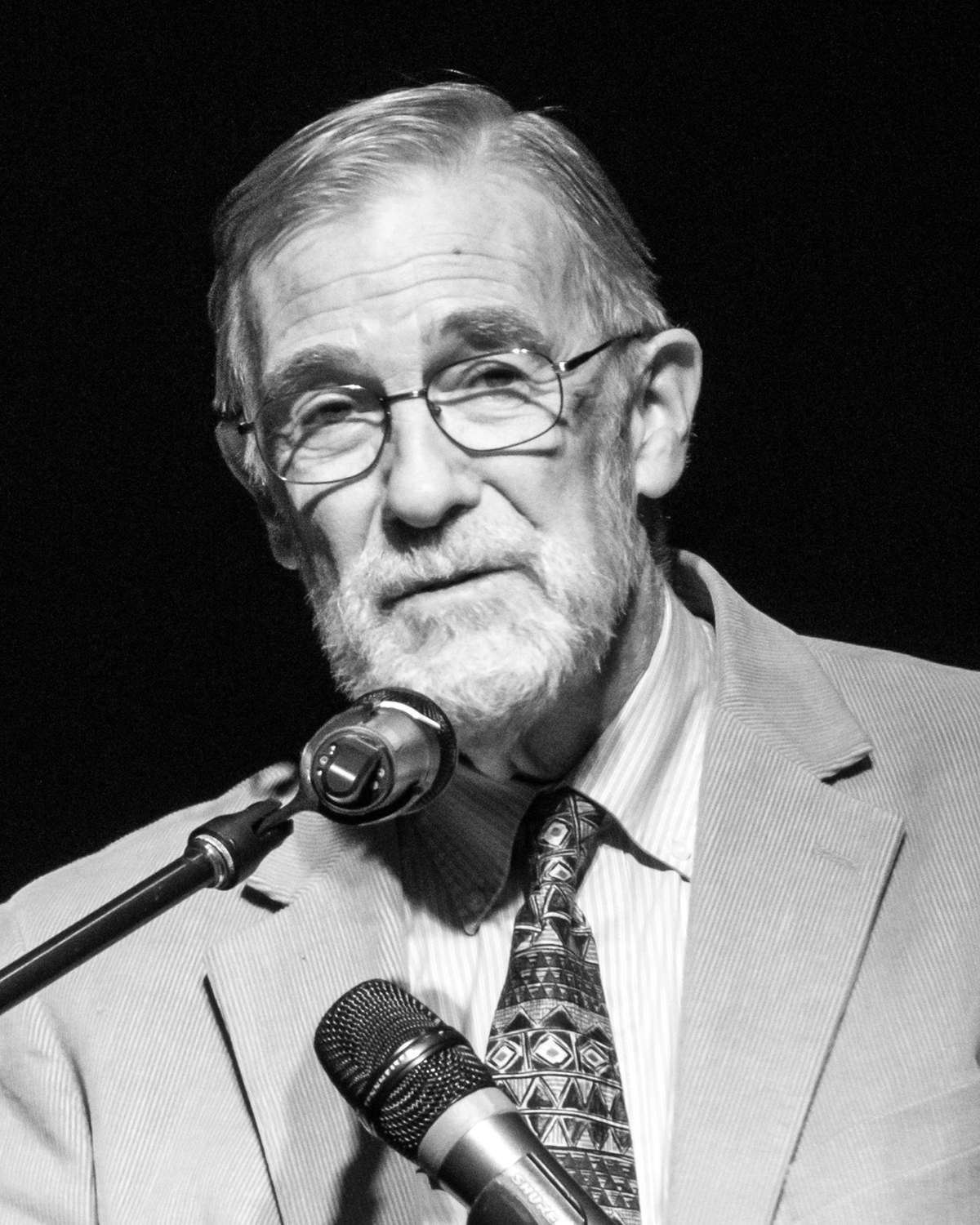
- McGovern in 2015
- Born: August 25, 1939 (age 87); The Bronx, New York City, U.S.
- Education: Fordham University (BA, MA)
- Awards: Intelligence Commendation Medal (1990; returned 2006)

Raymond McGovern (born August 25, 1939) is an American political activist and former Central Intelligence Agency (CIA) officer. McGovern was a CIA analyst from 1963 to 1990, and in the 1980s chaired National Intelligence Estimates and participated in preparing the President's Daily Brief. He received the Intelligence Commendation Medal at his retirement, returning it in 2006 to protest the CIA's involvement in torture. McGovern's post-retirement work includes commenting on various YouTube podcasts and writing for various publications. In 2003 he co-founded Veteran Intelligence Professionals for Sanity (VIPS).

== Personal life ==
Ray McGovern was born and grew up in the Bronx, New York City. McGovern earned a BA from Fordham University, and received a scholarship to earn an MA with honours in Russian Language, Literature and History. In the early 1960s, he served as a U.S. Army infantry/intelligence officer and in the analysis division on Soviet foreign policy, especially with respect to China and Indochina.

McGovern is married to Rita Kennedy; the couple have five children and eight grandchildren.

== Career ==
McGovern was a CIA analyst for 27 years (April 1963 to August 1990), serving seven U.S. presidents. His CIA career began under President John F. Kennedy, and lasted through the presidency of George H. W. Bush. McGovern advised Henry Kissinger during the Richard Nixon administration, and during the Ronald Reagan administration he chaired National Intelligence Estimates and prepared the President's Daily Brief.

At his retirement in 1990, McGovern received the CIA's Intelligence Commendation Medal. He returned the medal "in protest in 2006 over CIA use of torture."

== Activism ==
=== Intelligence activism ===
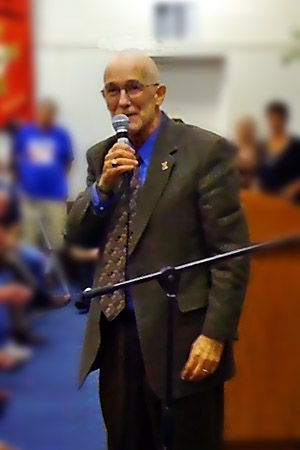
McGovern, 2008

After retiring from the CIA, McGovern became a commentator on intelligence-related issues from the late 1990s onwards. He was heavily critical of the government's handling of the Wen Ho Lee case in 2000. In 2002, he was publicly critical of President George W. Bush's use of government intelligence in the lead-up to the war in Iraq.

In 2003, together with other former CIA employees, McGovern founded the Veteran Intelligence Professionals for Sanity (VIPS), which is dedicated to analyzing and criticizing the use of intelligence, at first concerning the Iraq War.

In 2006, McGovern confronted Donald Rumsfeld on a live CNN broadcast about his statements concerning weapons of mass destruction, an interaction later called the "vivisection of Donald Rumsfeld" by Keith Olbermann.

In January 2006, McGovern began speaking out on behalf of the anti-war group Not in Our Name. According to the group's press release, McGovern served symbolic "war crimes indictments" on the Bush White House from a "people's tribunal."

In 2006, McGovern returned his Intelligence Commendation Medal in protest of the CIA's involvement with torture. He wrote then that he "abhor[red] the corruption of the CIA in the past several years, believe it to be beyond repair, and do not want my name on any medallion associated with it.

On October 9, 2013, McGovern, along with three former winners, presented the Sam Adams Award for integrity in intelligence to Edward Snowden in a Moscow ceremony.

In September 2015, McGovern and 27 other members of VIPS steering group wrote a letter to President Barack Obama lambasting Rebuttal: The CIA Responds to the Senate Intelligence Committee's Study of Its Detention and Interrogation, a then-recently published book that challenged the report of the United States Senate Intelligence Committee on the CIA's use of torture.

In December 2015, McGovern participated in Russian state media outlet RT's tenth anniversary celebration, alongside then-retired director of the Defense Intelligence Agency Michael Flynn and frequent Green Party presidential candidate Jill Stein, hosted by Russian president Vladimir Putin.

=== Arrests ===
During a 2011 speech at George Washington University by then-Secretary of State Hillary Clinton, McGovern stood with his back turned during her remarks, blocking the view of some of the audience and media for about five minutes in "silent protest" of Clinton's foreign policy. McGovern refused to cooperate when asked to leave by security, which led to his arrest for disorderly conduct. McGovern said that the State Department placed him on a "be on the lookout" list, and that such a list authorized law enforcement to stop and question him on sight. The charges were subsequently dropped. In 2014, McGovern's lawyer filed a lawsuit against the campus police department for allegedly using excessive force and also against the university and State Department for allegedly violating his right to peacefully protest. McGovern said the police officers had "brutalized" him and "rammed" him into a door. The suit against the arresting officer was dismissed by the U.S. Court of Appeals for the D.C. Circuit, which opined that police had probable cause to arrest McGovern, and that after viewing film made by news organizations of the event, that police did not use excessive force.

In 2014, McGovern was arrested by the New York City police department at a private event where former CIA director and retired Army General David Petraeus was giving a speech. McGovern said he wanted to ask Petraeus about his involvement in the wars in Iraq and Afghanistan, but the event's host told him he was not welcome. He said he had a ticket to the event, but when he refused to leave, was charged with criminal trespassing and resisting arrest. On February 4, 2015, McGovern accepted adjournment in contemplation of dismissal, meaning the charges would be dropped if McGovern did not commit any new offenses.

On May 9, 2018, McGovern was one of several protesters who disrupted the Senate confirmation hearing of Gina Haspel to become CIA director. After he began yelling about waterboarding, McGovern was forcibly removed by Capitol Police and charged with disruption and resisting arrest.

== Views ==
=== Vietnam War ===
In a 2003 interview with the UK's Independent newspaper, McGovern said that Lyndon B. Johnson seized on the Gulf of Tonkin incident as a "spur-of-the-moment thing" rather than as part of a calculated drive to war.

=== Pope John Paul II ===
A Catholic from birth, McGovern was highly critical of Pope John Paul II's conservative stance on women's rights in church. He saw the former Pope as a repressive force. McGovern had been teaching Sunday school and earned a certificate in theology from Georgetown University. He has participated in Cursillo, and was district president of Bread for the City. By standing during mass for several weeks he protested against the teaching on sex roles and sexual ethics which to him seemed oppressive.

=== Iraq War ===
McGovern sharply criticised the 2003 invasion of Iraq and its justification by the Bush administration, which he described as a "very calculated, 18-month, orchestrated, incredibly cynical campaign of lies that we've seen to justify a war".

McGovern testified at a Democratic National Headquarters forum in 2005 that had been convened by Rep. John Conyers (D-Mich.) of the House Judiciary Committee on the Downing Street memo. The Washington Post reported in 2005 that, in his testimony, McGovern "declared that the United States went to war in Iraq for oil, Israel and military bases craved by administration neocons so 'the United States and Israel could dominate that part of the world.'" He said that Israel should not be considered an ally and that Bush was doing the bidding of Israeli Prime Minister Ariel Sharon. 'Israel is not allowed to be brought up in polite conversation,' McGovern said. Genuine criticism of official Israeli policy is often portrayed as if it were anti-semitism: 'The last time I did this, the previous director of Central Intelligence called me anti-semitic.'" He repeated the comments the following year in a television interview with Tucker Carlson on MSNBC. McGovern said: "I've been using the acronym O.I.L. for many—for two years now: O for oil; I for Israel; and L for logistics, logistics being the permanent—now we say "enduring"—military bases that the U.S. wants to keep in Iraq."

=== Julian Assange, WikiLeaks and Edward Snowden ===
When asked in 2010 on TVNZ whether Julian Assange was a hero or villain, he replied "hero". When asked the same year whether Julian Assange was a journalist, he replied to the CNN reporter: "Yeah, actually, with all due respect, I think you should be following his example." In 2010, he co-wrote an open letter of support for WikiLeaks and Assange, with Coleen Rowley, Lawrence Wilkerson, Craig Murray and others.

=== Syria ===
During the Syrian civil war, McGovern told Russian television channel RT and other outlets that the sarin used in the 2013 Ghouta chemical attack had not been manufactured by the Syrian government.

=== Russian interference in the 2016 presidential election ===
McGovern holds a position that the theft of the DNC emails was an inside job, and not the work of Russian agents. In McGovern's view, the metadata in the files released by Guccifer 2.0 (whom the US intelligence community identifies as a Russian military intelligence operation) originated from a computer in the Eastern United States but was manipulated to give the appearance that the documents came from Russia. With William Binney, McGovern released a VIPS report in support of his theory, which was taken up by The Nation and other outlets and promoted by Russian state media. Many of the VIPS members, however, did not sign the report. Binney later changed his mind and admitted that the underlying files were manipulated and a fabrication to support a pro-Kremlin disinformation campaign. McGovern continues to take the position that the DNC wasn't hacked by Russian intelligence, but had actually hacked itself.

=== Russia and Ukraine ===
In 2016, McGovern said he was not convinced about Russian involvement in the shooting down of Malaysia Airlines Flight 17 in 2014 over eastern Ukraine. He said the US had conducted a propaganda campaign "to paint Putin in the blackest of colours" and justify the imposition of sanctions.

== Publications ==
Book chapters

- "A Compromised Central Intelligence Agency: What Can Be Done?" In: Curtis, Alan (ed). Patriotism, Democracy, and Common Sense: Restoring America's Promise at Home and Abroad. Lanham, MD: Rowman & Littlefield; Washington, D.C.: Milton S. Eisenhower Foundation, 2004, pp. 91-110.
