= National Intelligence Superior Service Medal =

United States intelligence medal

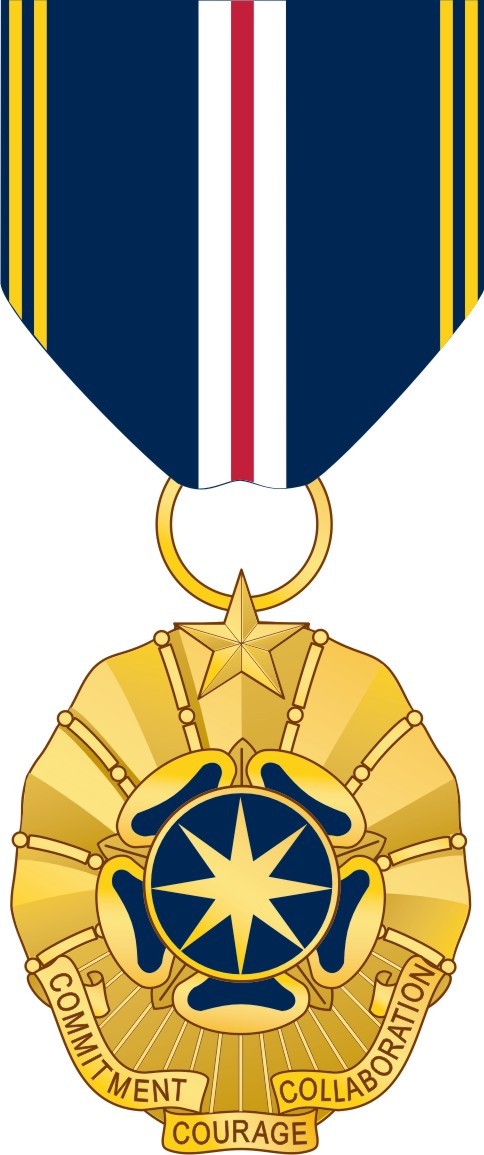
- Obverse of the National Intelligence Superior Service Medal
- Type: Individual award
- Awarded for: Superior service and/or a lasting contribution to the US Intelligence Community and the US as a whole.
- Presented by: United States Intelligence Community
- Eligibility: United States Government civilian and military personnel
- Status: Active
- National Intelligence Superior Service Medal ribbon

Precedence
- Next (higher): National Intelligence Distinguished Service Medal
- Next (lower): National Intelligence Reform Medal

The National Intelligence Superior Service Medal is an award of the National Intelligence Awards Program that recognizes an individual's superior service or a lasting contribution over a long period of time to the United States Intelligence Community and the United States as a whole. The medal ranks below the National Intelligence Distinguished Service Medal, but above the National Intelligence Exceptional Achievement Medal.

== See also ==
- Awards and decorations of the United States government
