= Boris Bazhanov =

Soviet politician and defector (1900–1982)

- Born: Boris Georgiyevich Bazhanov; 9 August 1900; Mogilev-Podolskiy, Russian Empire
- Died: 30 December 1982 (aged 82); Paris, France
- Resting place: Père Lachaise Cemetery, Paris
- Other names: Boris Bašanov; Boris Bajanov; Boris Baschanow
- Citizenship: Russian (until 1917); Soviet (1917–1928); French (from 1928)
- Known for: Stalin-era defector

Boris Georgiyevich Bazhanov (Russian: Бори́с Гео́ргиевич Бажа́нов; 9 August 1900 – 30 December 1982) was a secretary of the Secretariat of the Communist Party of the Soviet Union who published memoirs about Stalin and his secrets.

Bazhanov was the personal secretary of Soviet leader Joseph Stalin from August 1923 to 1925 and held several prominent positions in the Politburo until defecting from the Soviet Union in 1928. Bazhanov was granted French citizenship and survived subsequent Soviet assassination attempts, writing and publishing memoirs and books from 1930 about Stalin and the secrets behind the Stalin regime. Bazhanov was the only member of Stalin's Secretariat to defect, and one of the first major defectors from the Eastern Bloc.

David W. Doyle, who translated Bazhanov's book "Bazhanov and the Damnation of Stalin", described him as "a usually reliable source," but that "he should be read with caution where he displays bias or discusses his own motive". Similarly, Western historian Robert Conquest, viewed his account as "very useful, though not always authenticable".

== Early life ==
Boris Georgiyevich Bazhanov was born on 9 August 1900, in Mogilev-Podolskiy, Russian Empire (present-day Vinnytsia Oblast, Ukraine). He was the son of a physician. Bazhanov was 16 years old upon the beginning of the Russian Revolution in March 1917. Bazhanov's native Ukraine witnessed some of the worst splintering of power, and the Ukrainian territory was fought over continuously by various ideological factions during the Ukrainian Civil War. In 1918 Bazhanov graduated from high school, and that September entered the University of Kiev despite the political situation. However, the university was closed shortly after his arrival, and during a student protest of the closure, Bazhanov was shot and returned home to recover.

== Communist Party membership ==
Bazhanov joined the Communist Party of the Soviet Union (CPSU) in 1919, recalling later that he'd had to choose between Ukrainian nationalism and communism. He later wrote he had rejected Ukrainian nationalism because he had been raised with the Russian culture. He was elected district secretary and climbed the CPSU ranks in Ukraine. In November 1920, Bazhanov went to Moscow and studied engineering. Ukraine's political disputes ended in a victory for the communists and the territory split among the Ukrainian Soviet Socialist Republic, Poland, Czechoslovakia and Romania. In 1922, the Ukrainian SSR joined the Soviet Union as one of its constituent republics. Bazhanov applied to the Politburo of the Communist Party of the Soviet Union, the highest policy-making authority within the CPSU, for a technical position. Bazhanov's application was accepted by Ivan Ksenofontov, a prominent member of the Soviet Union's state security apparatus.

On 9 August 1923, Bazhanov was appointed as the personal secretary and assistant to Joseph Stalin, the General Secretary of the CPSU. The decision read: "Comrade Bazhanov is named assistant to Joseph Stalin and a secretary of the CC."

== Stalin's assistant ==
As General Secretary Stalin's assistant, Bazhanov became Secretary of the Politburo and was responsible for taking notes of the meetings. On 26 October 1923, Bazhanov took notes at a Central Committee meeting attended by Stalin, Soviet leader Vladimir Lenin, and Leon Trotsky, at a time when Lenin was very ill and just three months before his death. During the meeting, Lenin offered to appoint Trotsky as his "heir." According to Bazhanov's notes, Trotsky refused the position of deputy leader because he was Jewish, reasoning "We should not give our enemies the opportunity to say that our country was being ruled by a Jew. ... It would be far better if there was not a single Jew in the first Soviet revolutionary government." Bazhanov's notes were discovered in early 1990 by Soviet historian Victor Danilov and were seen as providing the answer to a long-asked question about the Bolshevik Revolution: why Trotsky refused Lenin's offer to name him heir-apparent. After Lenin's death in January 1924, Stalin, Lev Kamenev, and Grigory Zinoviev together governed the CPSU as a triumvirate, placing themselves ideologically between Trotsky (on the left wing of the party) and Nikolay Bukharin (on the right). Bazhanov was Stalin's personal secretary at the beginning of his power struggle with Trotsky and rise to becoming the undisputed leader of the Soviet Union. Trotsky was eventually forced into exile in Mexico, where he was later assassinated in 1940 by Ramón Mercader, a pro-Stalin agent.

From 1923 to 1924, Bazhanov attended all of the Politburo meetings, working in Stalin's Secretariat of the CPSU Central Committee and for the Politburo until the end of 1925. In the early 1920s, Bazhanov's role in Stalin's inner circle was smaller than that of the "group of five" composed of Yakov Brezanovsky, Ivan Tovstukha, Amayak Nazaretyan, Georgy Kanner, and Lev Mekhlis, but his influence with Stalin increased after Brezanovsky and Nazaretyan left the secretariat, and he held various positions at the Politburo from 1925 until 1928.

== Defection ==
On 1 January 1928, Bazhanov defected from the Soviet Union after becoming disillusioned with communism and dissatisfied with working under Stalin. His book "Damnation and Stalin" also "reveals how those Soviets with a sense of fairness, justice, and ethics were extinguished by Stalin and his minions, and how the self–centered, protective bureaucratic machine was first built." Bazhanov scheduled a business trip to Ashgabat, in the Soviet Union's territory in Central Asia, and crossed the border into Iran. Bazhanov defected the same year that the first of Stalin's five-year plans for the national economy of the Soviet Union was accepted, avoiding the first purges that led up to the Great Purge in the mid-to-late 1930s. Bazhanov was the only member of Stalin's Secretariat who would turn against the Soviet regime, and subsequently he was granted asylum in France.

Bazhanov became an enemy of Stalin and an enemy of the state through his defection, and was subject to numerous assassination attempts during the remainder of his life. Soviet security agencies immediately launched a manhunt for Bazhanov led by Georges Agabekov, the chief Soviet spy in the Near East at that time, until Agabekov himself defected to France shortly afterwards in June 1930. The Iranian authorities protected Bazhanov from the Joint State Political Directorate, the Soviet secret police, who had sent agents from Moscow to assassinate him. However, Bazhanov learned that an agreement was reached between Iran and the Soviet Union through diplomatic channels to extradite him back. Bazhanov left his detention and illegally crossed the Iranian–Indian border, from where he moved to France with the help of the British authorities. In October 1929, Stalin ordered assassin Yakov Blumkin to travel via Paris to kill Bazhanov before travelling to the island of Büyükada in Istanbul, Turkey, to assassinate Trotsky, who had been deported from the Soviet Union in February 1929. With the help of his cousin and GPU informer Arkady Maximov, Blumkin staged a car accident to kill Bazhanov; however, the plot failed. Bazhanov also recalled a later assassination attempt in 1937, stating that a "Spaniard, doubtless an anarchist or communist, tried to stab me as I was returning home, as I did each evening, after having left the car in the garage."

== World War II and collaboration ==
Allegedly, upon the outbreak of the Winter War, Bazhanov had attempted to organize a legion of anti-communist Russian émigrés and Soviet prisoners of war to fight with the Finnish Army against the Soviet Union, but the plan never became reality as the war ended before it was properly organized. According to Bazhanov himself, on the eve of Operation Barbarossa, he visited Berlin and met with Alfred Rosenberg, the head of the Reich Ministry for the Occupied Eastern Territories of Nazi Germany, and his deputy Georg Leibbrandt. Rosenberg was studying the possibility of using Bazhanov to form a new government in the Soviet Union's territory, but Bazhanov was skeptical of Germany's plans and returned to Paris.

== Later career and death ==
In the conclusion of the 1978 book The Storm Petrels: The Flight of the First Soviet Defectors, Bazhanov remarked on "the twisted path of Marxism":

You know, as I do, that our civilization stands on the edge of an abyss ... Those who seek to destroy it put forth an ideal. This ideal [of communism] has been proven false by the experience of the last sixty years ... the problem of bringing freedom back to Russia is not insoluble ... the youth of Russia no longer believe in the system, despite the fact that they have known nothing else. If the West [develops its] confidence and unity, [it] can win the battle for our civilization and set humanity on the true path to progress, not the twisted path of Marxism.

Bazhanov published an edition of his memoirs in France in 1980, entitled Memoirs of a Secretary of Stalin's. He died in the 4th arrondissement of Paris on 30 December 1982, and is buried at Père Lachaise cemetery.

== Editions of Bazhanov's memoirs ==
=== Retracted parts of the first edition ===
The 1930 edition of Bazhanov's memoir had him becoming an anti-communist well before he came to Moscow and took up positions with the Central Committee. In later editions, Bazhanov retracted these statements, explaining that in reality he soured on the communist ideology during 1923 to 1924, while working at the Central Committee. However, he was bound to protect his closet-dissident friends remaining behind in the USSR, by casting himself as a "lone avenger" figure.

=== List of editions ===
- Bajanov, Boris (1930). Avec Staline dans le Kremlin (With Stalin in the Kremlin) (Paris: Les Éditions de France) (in French). Editions de France. LCCN 92892852. OL 1367658M.
- Bazhanov, Boris (1930). Pokhishchenie generala A.P. Kutepova bolʹshevikami; sli︠e︡dstvennye i politicheskie materialy.: sli︠e︡dstvennye i politicheskie materialy. Imp. "Pascal".
- Bazhanov, Boris (1931). Stalin, der rote Diktator. P. Aretz.
- Bazhanov, Boris (1931). Al servicio de Stalin: El zar rojo de todas las Rusias. Ulises.
- Bašanov, Boris (1933). Ich war Stalins Sekretär. Ullstein.
- Bazhanov, Boris (1977). Ich war Stalins Sekretar (Aufl ed.). Ullstein. ISBN 3-550-17350-4.
- Bazhanov, Boris (1979). Bajanov révèle Staline. Souvenirs d'un ancien secrétaire de Staline. Gallimard. ISBN 2070298876.
- Bazhanov, Boris (1990). Vospominaniia byvshego sekretaria Stalina. SP Sofinta. ASIN B0000D6JAZ.
- Bazhanov, Boris (30 April 1990). Bazhanov and the Damnation of Stalin. Translated by Doyle, David W. Ohio University Press. ISBN 0-8214-0948-4.
- Bazhanov, Boris (1992). Vospominaniia byvshego sekretaria Stalina. Kn-vo "Vsemirnoe slovo". ISBN 5-86442-004-2.
- Bazhanov, Boris (1993). Hokmdarlar: Stalin, Pol Pot, Saddam Husein. Iazychy, Baku. ISBN 5-560-01210-6. Archived from the original on 8 June 2011.
- Bazhanov, Boris (1993). Воспоминания бывшего секретаря Сталина. ТЕРРА. ISBN 5-300-01278-5.

== See also ==
- List of Soviet and Eastern Bloc defectors
