= James Barron (journalist) =

American journalist

- Born: December 25, 1955 (age 70); United States
- Occupations: Journalist, author
- Employer: The New York Times
- Notable credit: Piano: The Making of a Steinway Concert Grand (book)
- Spouse: Dr. Jane-Iris Farhi

James Turman Barron (born December 25, 1955) is an American journalist who writes for The New York Times. He authored the 2006 book on piano manufacturing, Piano: The Making of a Steinway Concert Grand.

== Biography ==
He was born on December 25, 1955, to Leirona Turman and James Pressley Barron (1920–2006). His father served in the U.S. Army in World War II and was an analyst for the Central Intelligence Agency. He received the Intelligence Commendation Medal upon his retirement in 1985.

His mother was an assistant principal of Thomas Jefferson Junior High School in Arlington, Virginia, United States.

He graduated from Princeton University in 1977 and was a stringer for The New York Times while in college.

He married Jane-Iris Farhi, a cardiologist.

== Bibliography ==
- Piano: The Making of a Steinway Concert Grand. New York: Times Books. 2006. ISBN 0-8050-7878-9.
- The one-cent magenta: inside the quest to own the most valuable stamp in the world. Chapel Hill, NC: Algonquin Books. 2017. ISBN 9781616205188.
