= David W. Doyle =

CIA officer and writer

David W. Doyle (7 May 1924 – 19 February 2014) was a British-born American author, United States Army Veteran, and former Central Intelligence Agency officer.

Born at Harrow, in Greater London, Doyle was the son of Donald and Joyce Doyle (née Kennedy). The family moved to Brussels, the capital of Belgium, in 1925 and returned to London in 1932, and it was there that Doyle began to attend Colet Court, a prep school. In 1938 he went to Gresham's School in Norfolk. In 1942 he enlisted in the Royal Engineers, then in April 1943 transferred to the US Army, serving in the Office of Strategic Services as a driver and interpreter. In 1945 he was part of an OSS unit attached to the 18th Airborne Corps and at the end of World War II was discharged at Fort Logan, Colorado.

Doyle then attended Princeton University, graduating in 1949. He joined the CIA in March 1949 and was in its Domestic Operations Division (Aliens Branch) until 1950, followed by two years in the San Francisco Office. He then joined the Directorate for Plans (now the Directorate of Operations) and the Foreign Intelligence Staff, Projects Branch. In 1955 he transferred to the Far Eastern Division and from 1960 to 1961 was posted to the breakaway African state of Katanga, followed by two years in Burundi. In 1963 he became chief of station at Dakar, Senegal, where he remained until 1967, then was with the CIA's Soviet Bloc Division until a posting to Brussels (1969–1971) and then to the Africa Division. He retired from the CIA in 1972 and was awarded the Intelligence Commendation Medal in 1975.

In retirement Doyle became an energy consultant with the United States Department of Energy and also an author. He lived in Honolulu from 1980 up until his death. In 1960 he had been rescued from drowning off Waikiki Beach by a life guard, which inspired him to write his book Rescue in Paradise (2001). He spoke five languages, and his fluency in French was an especially significant influence on his career.

His book Inside Intelligence / True Men and Traitors argues the continuing need for the CIA in an uncertain world. It gives a firsthand account of his own active service, including his time as chief of station in the Congo when Patrice Lumumba was assassinated, revealing exactly what happened and who the killers were. The word 'traitors' in the book's title refers to a section on a number of those who betrayed the CIA, including Aldrich Ames.

== Selected publications ==
- An Accurate Watch (William Morrow & Co., 1990)
- Bazhanov and the Damnation of Stalin (Ohio University Press, 1990; transl. and ed. from French of Boris Bazhanov)
- Inside Espionage: A Memoir of True Men and Traitors (2000, ISBN 978-0-9536151-4-8)
- Rescue in Paradise: Oahu's Beaches & Their Guardians (Island Heritage, 2001)
