= National Intelligence Cross =

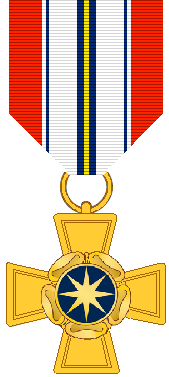
- National Intelligence Cross medal
- Type: Individual Significant Contribution Award
- Awarded for: Conspicuous gallantry, extraordinary heroism, and courage in the face of a significant and known risk above and beyond the call of duty.
- Presented by: The United States Intelligence Community
- Eligibility: United States Government intelligence community civilian and military personnel
- Status: Active
- Established: 1 October 2008
- National Intelligence Cross Medal ribbon

Precedence
- Next (higher): George Washington Spymaster Award
- Next (lower): National Intelligence Medal for Valor

The National Intelligence Cross is a decoration of the United States Intelligence Community (IC) awarded under the National Intelligence Awards (NIA) Program by the Office of the Director of National Intelligence (ODNI). It is the highest award presented by the Office of the Director of National Intelligence. It is equivalent of the Central Intelligence Agency's Distinguished Intelligence Cross.

== Criteria ==
The National Intelligence Cross may be awarded to United States government civilian or military personnel who have gone above and beyond the call of duty in response to a threat to national security. It is awarded for conspicuous gallantry, extraordinary heroism, and courage in the face of significant and known risk.

== Appearance ==
The medal is a 24-karat goldplated triangular armed cross pattée, 1.5 inches (38 mm) inches across. In the center of the cross is a pole star on a dark blue enameled disk, superimposed over a sub rosa device.

The cross is suspended from a ribbon 1.375 inches (34.9 mm) wide. It consists of wide edge stripes of scarlet, a stripe of white separated by a thin stripe of old glory blue, with central stripe of golden yellow bordered on each side by stripes of old glory blue.

== See also ==
- Awards and decorations of the United States government
