= Ilya Dzhirkvelov =

Georgian author, journalist and KGB agent (born 1927)

- Илья Джирквелов
- Born: 1927 (age 98–99)
- Citizenship: United Kingdom
- Children: 2
- Espionage activity
- Allegiance: Soviet Union
- Agency: KGB
- Rank: Captain of the KGB

Ilya Grigoryevich Dzhirkvelov (Russian: Илья Григорьевич Джирквелов; born 1927) is a former Georgian author, journalist, TASS editor and KGB agent who defected from the Soviet Union in 1980 and then lived in England. For his defection he was sentenced to death in absentia.

== Biography ==
Dzhirkvelov was born in 1927 in Tbilisi, Georgia. In 1943, at the age of 16, he joined the youth wing of the Communist Party of the Soviet Union, the Komsomol. He also started doing volunteer reconnaissance work against Nazi Germany around that time. In 1944, Dzhirkvelov was recruited into the NKVD, which would later be known as the KGB.

His first posting was in Crimea to help the deportation of the native Crimean Tatars. The Tatars were rounded up on wagons and sent to Siberia or, in some cases, the firing squad. In 1945 Dzhirkvelov attended the Yalta Conference as a guard, which was one of the three major wartime conferences of World War II.

After the war, he was sent to an espionage school, which he attended until graduation in 1947. After his graduation, he was posted in Romania for several months, but was then recalled and reassigned to do work in the Middle East, primarily Turkey and Iran. In 1957, with his final rank as captain, he was voluntarily discharged from the KGB. In 1966, he started work as a journalist for TASS as its correspondent to Sudan and Tanzania. While in Africa, Dzhirkvelov still kept in contact with the KGB and contributed to what could be characterised as a ‘disinformation campaign,’ such as discrediting the American Peace Corps by characterizing it as a front for the CIA. He was expelled along with other Soviet officials after the failure of the 1971 Sudanese coup d'état. He was recalled to Moscow where he served as chief foreign editor for TASS, but when in 1975 he was appointed as correspondent to Zambia, Zambian President Kenneth Kaunda refused him entry into the country, as Dzhirkvelov was identified as being involved with the KGB.

In 1976, Dzhirkvelov was posted to Geneva, Switzerland, as an information officer for the World Health Organization. In 1980 while still posted in Geneva, Dzhirkvelov defected to NATO with his family. Dzhirkvelov asserts the defection was motivated not politically but for a better life for his family in the west. Then he lived in London, England, and in 1988 published a book, Secret Servant: My life with the KGB and Soviet Elite.
