= Career Commendation Medal =

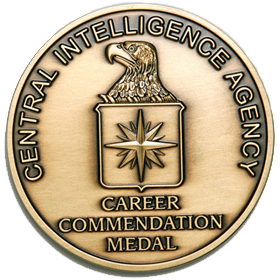
- Awarded for: "Awarded for exemplary service significantly above normal duties that had an important contribution to the Agency’s mission."
- Country: United States of America
- Presented by: Central Intelligence Agency
- Eligibility: Employees of the Central Intelligence Agency

Precedence
- Next (higher): Career Intelligence Medal
- Next (lower): Intelligence Commendation Medal

The Career Commendation Medal is awarded by the Central Intelligence Agency for exemplary service significantly above normal duties that had an important contribution to the Agency's mission.

== See also ==
- Awards and decorations of the United States government
