= National Intelligence Reform Medal =

United States intelligence medal

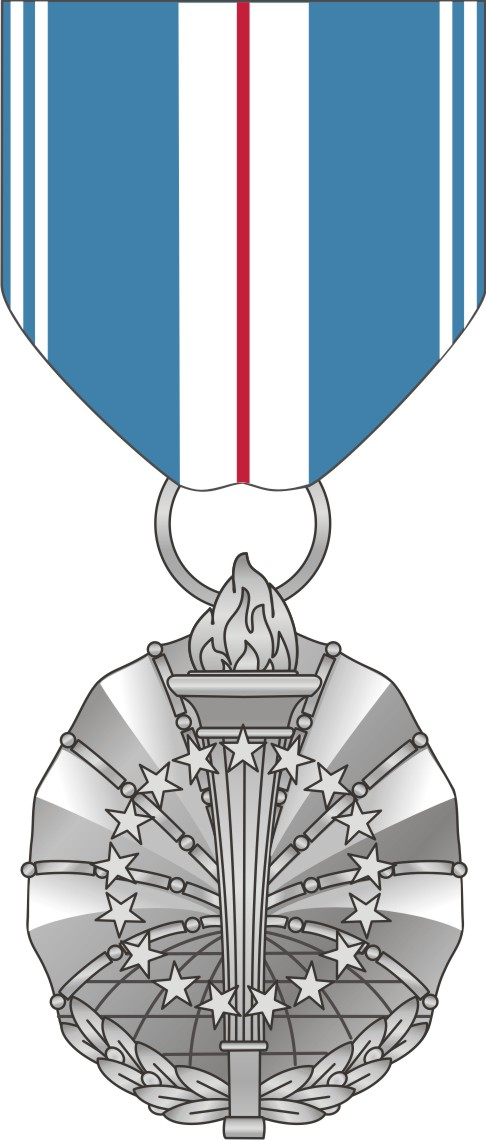
- Obverse of the National Intelligence Reform Medal
- Type: Individual award
- Awarded for: Extraordinary service in implementing the Intelligence Reform and Terrorism Prevention Act
- Presented by: the United States Intelligence Community
- Eligibility: United States Government civilian and military personnel
- Status: Discontinued November 2010
- Established: 23 May 2007
- National Intelligence Reform Medal ribbon

Precedence
- Next (higher): National Intelligence Superior Service Medal
- Next (lower): National Intelligence Exceptional Achievement Medal

The National Intelligence Reform Medal is an award of the United States Intelligence Community's National Intelligence Awards Program that recognizes extraordinary service in implementing the Intelligence Reform and Terrorism Prevention Act. The medal ranks below the National Intelligence Superior Service Medal, but above the National Intelligence Exceptional Achievement Medal. Established 23 May 2007 with the creation of the National Intelligence Awards Program, it was retired in November 2010.

== Notable recipients ==
- Melissa Hathaway, former director of the Joint Interagency Cyber Task Force, Office of the Director of National Intelligence
- Robert V. Hoppa, US Navy rear admiral and former director of the National Maritime Intelligence-Integration Office
- Thomas P. Meek, retired US Navy rear admiral and former director of Military Support for the National Geospatial-Intelligence Agency
- Michael Morell, retired deputy director of the Central Intelligence Agency
- Al Tarasiuk, Associate Director of National Intelligence and Chief Information Officer

== See also ==
- Awards and decorations of the United States government
