= George Washington Spymaster Award =

United States Intelligence Community award

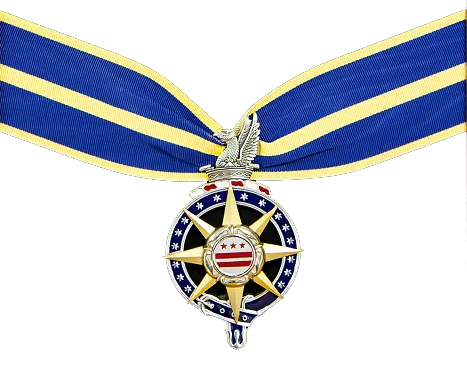
- Type: Civilian award
- Awarded for: Invaluable contributions to the United States Intelligence Community
- Presented by: Office of the Director of National Intelligence
- Eligibility: Distinguished Intelligence Community personnel
- Ribbon

Precedence
- Next (lower): National Intelligence Cross, Distinguished Intelligence Cross (Note: The precise order of precedence in awards of the ODNI and the CIA is not clear, as most recipients do not advertise the fact.)

The George Washington Spymaster Award is the highest honor that can be bestowed by the Director of National Intelligence, and may be given to civilians or military personnel working for the United States Intelligence Community. The award comes with a full-sized medal, a necklet, a lapel pin, and a ribbon.

Named after George Washington, the first President of the United States and military strategist, the award is highly prestigious in the United States Intelligence Community and is presented by the Director of National Intelligence personally to the recipient.

== Notable recipients ==
Very few recipients of this award are known to the general public; among them are:

- Paul Nakasone, NSA
- Stephanie O'Sullivan, CIA and ODNI
- Robert D. Sharp, USN and NGA
- Harry Wetherbee, CIA
