= Distinguished Intelligence Cross =

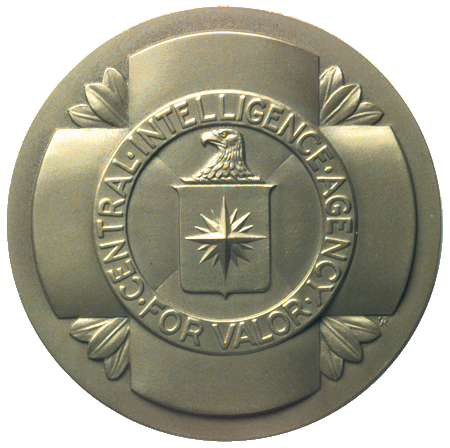
- Awarded for: "For a voluntary act or acts of extraordinary heroism involving the acceptance of existing dangers with conspicuous fortitude and exemplary courage."
- Country: United States of America
- Presented by: Central Intelligence Agency
- Eligibility: Employees of the Central Intelligence Agency

Precedence
- Next (lower): Distinguished Intelligence Medal
- Related: National Intelligence Cross, Distinguished Service Cross, Navy Cross, Air Force Cross

The Distinguished Intelligence Cross is the highest decoration awarded by the United States Central Intelligence Agency. It is given for "a voluntary act or acts of extraordinary heroism involving the acceptance of existing dangers with conspicuous fortitude and exemplary courage." Only 39 people have been awarded this medal in the agency's history, 11 of them posthumously. As a consequence, it is the rarest award for valor in the United States.

The Cross is the agency's equivalent of the military's Medal of Honor and the Service Cross, i.e., Navy Cross, Army Distinguished Service Cross, Air Force Cross. The agency has two awards for valor; the other is the Intelligence Star, which is analogous to the military's Silver Star. The Distinguished Intelligence Cross and its recipients are the subject of the book "The 39: Uncovering the Secret Heroes of the CIA" by Toby Harnden, to be published by Simon and Schuster in March 2027.

== Known recipients ==
- Leo F. Baker, posthumously for the Bay of Pigs invasion
- William F. Buckley
- John T. Downey
- Richard Fecteau
- Wade C. Gray, posthumously for the Bay of Pigs invasion
- James Monroe, CIA paramilitary officer during Vietnam War
- Thomas W. "Pete" Ray, posthumously for the Bay of Pigs invasion
- Riley W. Shamburger, posthumously for the Bay of Pigs invasion
- Greg Vogle, paramilitary officer and CIA trailblazer
- Molly Huckaby Hardy, posthumously for the 1998 United States embassy bombings in Nairobi
- David N. Tyson, for actions during the Battle of Qala-i-Jangi

== See also ==
- Awards and decorations of the United States government
