= Intelligence Commendation Medal =

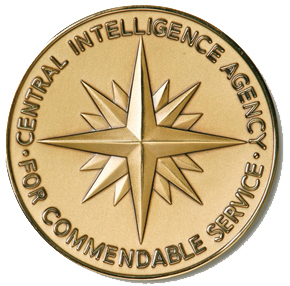
- Awarded for: "the performance of especially commendable service or for an act or achievement significantly above normal duties which results in an important contribution to the mission of the Agency."
- Country: United States of America
- Presented by: Central Intelligence Agency
- Eligibility: Employees of the Central Intelligence Agency

Precedence
- Next (higher): Career Commendation Medal
- Next (lower): Exceptional Service Medal

The Intelligence Commendation Medal is awarded by the Central Intelligence Agency for "the performance of especially commendable service or for an act or achievement significantly above normal duties which results in an important contribution to the mission of the Agency".

== Known recipients ==
- James Pressley Barron (1985)
- David W. Doyle
- Scott F. Large
- Ray McGovern
- Jonna Mendez

== See also ==
- Awards and decorations of the United States government
