= Career Intelligence Medal =

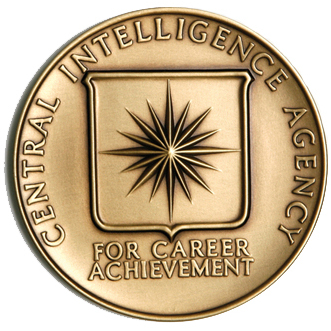
- Awarded for: "For a cumulative record of service which reflects exceptional achievements that substantially contributed to the mission of the Agency."
- Country: United States of America
- Presented by: Central Intelligence Agency
- Eligibility: Employees of the Central Intelligence Agency

Precedence
- Next (higher): Distinguished Career Intelligence Medal
- Next (lower): Career Commendation Medal

The Career Intelligence Medal is awarded by the Central Intelligence Agency for a cumulative record of service which reflects exceptional achievements that substantially contributed to the mission of the Agency.

== See also ==
- Awards and decorations of the United States government
