= National Intelligence Exceptional Achievement Medal =

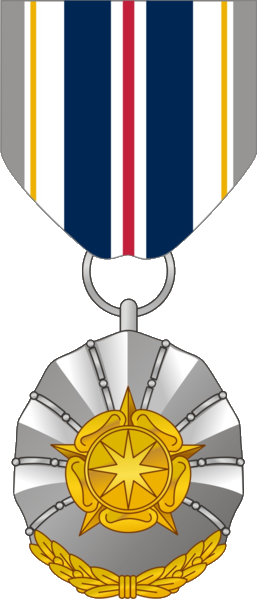
- Obverse of the National Intelligence Exceptional Achievement Medal
- Country: United States
- Presented by: the Director of National Intelligence
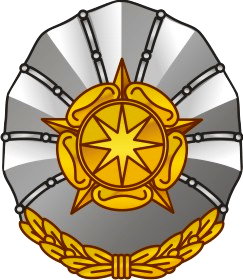
- Service Ribbon / Lapel Pin

Precedence
- Next (higher): National Intelligence Reform Medal
- Next (lower): National Intelligence Meritorious Unit Citation

The National Intelligence Exceptional Achievement Medal is an award of the National Intelligence Awards Program that recognizes a single significant act or contribution to the United States Intelligence Community and the United States as a whole.

== Criteria ==
The National Intelligence Exceptional Achievement Medal was established as part of the National Intelligence Awards Program, specifically as a National Intelligence Community Award (NICA), with the revision of Intelligence Community Directive 655 in 2012. As a NICA, it is awarded on behalf of the Director of National Intelligence in recognition for creditable service or contributions to the Intelligence Community (IC) and the United States. Nominations for the medal are submitted to the National Intelligence Awards Review Board for appropriate review and action.

The National Intelligence Exceptional Achievement Medal is presented to reward, "a single exceptional contribution to the IC and the US." It is awarded to eligible individuals on a "very selective basis". The medal may be awarded to United States government civilian or military personnel, and others on a "very selective basis."

== Appearance ==
The National Intelligence Exceptional Achievement Medal is a silver colored medal 1 7/16 inches (37 mm) in height, oval in shape. On the obverse of the medal, at the top is a scalloped design with seven raised sections, from the top down to the sides. In the center is a gold heraldic rose with a gold disc superimposed over it bearing a compass rose. At the base of the medal is a gold olive wreath. The reverse bears the words, NATIONAL INTELLIGENCE EXCEPTIONAL ACHIEVEMENT, in four lines. This is above a space to engrave the recipient's name. The base shares the olive wreath found on the obverse.

The suspension and service ribbons of the medal is white, 1 3/8 inches (35 mm) wide. In the middle, between two 1/4 inch (6.4 mm) dark blue stripes are three 1/16 inch (1.6 mm) stripes alternating, white, scarlet, and white. On both edges of the ribbon is a 1/8 inch (3.2 mm) silver gray stripe with 1/32 inch (0.79 mm) white and golden yellow stripes towards the center.
