= Assassination of John F. Kennedy =

1963 assassination in Dallas, Texas

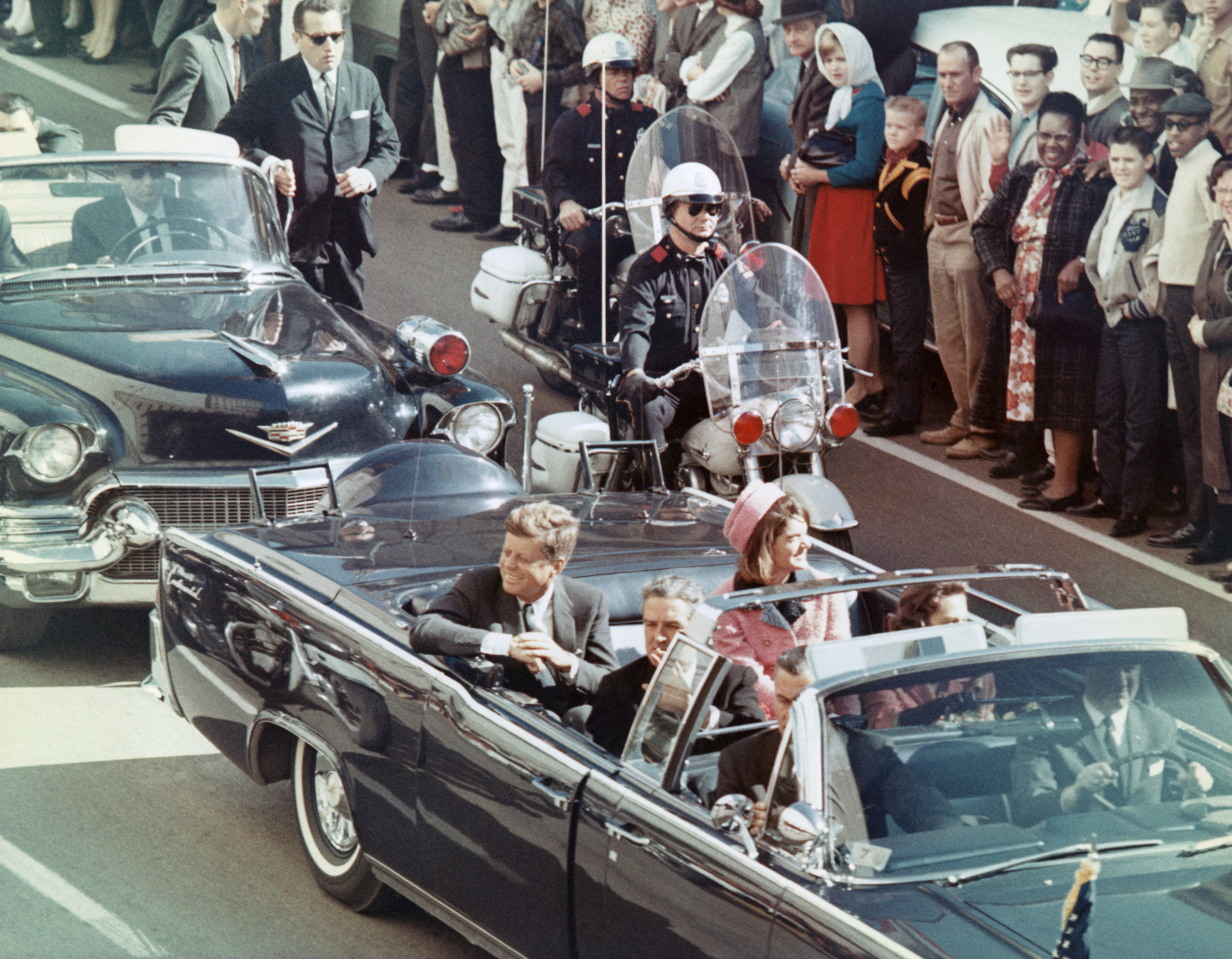
- President John F. Kennedy, First Lady Jacqueline Kennedy, Texas governor John Connally, and Connally's wife Nellie in the presidential limousine minutes before the assassination in Dallas
- Location: 32°46′45.4″N 96°48′30.6″W; Dealey Plaza, Dallas, Texas, U.S.
- Date: November 22, 1963; 63 years ago 12:30 p.m. (CST)
- Target: John F. Kennedy
- Attack type: Sniper assassination
- Weapons: 6.5×52mm Italian Carcano M91/38 rifle (Kennedy); .38 cal Smith & Wesson Victory Model revolver (Tippit)
- Deaths: John F. Kennedy; J. D. Tippit
- Injuries: John Connally; James Tague
- Perpetrator: Lee Harvey Oswald
- Charges: Murder with malice (2 counts, murdered before trial)

On Friday, November 22, 1963, John F. Kennedy, the 35th president of the United States, was assassinated while riding in a presidential motorcade through Dallas, Texas. Kennedy was in the vehicle with First Lady Jacqueline Kennedy, Texas governor John Connally, and Connally's wife Nellie, when he was fatally shot from the nearby Texas School Book Depository by Lee Harvey Oswald, a former U.S. Marine. The motorcade rushed to Parkland Memorial Hospital, where Kennedy was pronounced dead about 30 minutes after the shooting; Connally was also wounded in the attack but recovered. Vice President Lyndon B. Johnson was hastily sworn in as president two hours and eight minutes later aboard Air Force One at Dallas Love Field.

After the assassination, Oswald returned home to retrieve a pistol; he shot and killed a lone Dallas policeman J. D. Tippit shortly afterwards. Around 70 minutes after Kennedy and Connally were shot, Oswald was apprehended by the Dallas Police Department and charged under Texas state law with the murders of Kennedy and Tippit. Two days later, as live television cameras covered Oswald being moved through the basement of Dallas Police Headquarters, he was fatally shot by Dallas nightclub operator Jack Ruby. Like Kennedy, Oswald was taken to Parkland Memorial Hospital, where he soon died. Ruby was convicted of Oswald's murder, though the decision was overturned on appeal, and Ruby died in prison in 1967 while awaiting a new trial.

After a 10-month investigation, the Warren Commission concluded that Oswald assassinated Kennedy, and that there was no evidence that either Oswald or Ruby was part of a conspiracy. In 1967, New Orleans district attorney Jim Garrison brought the only trial for Kennedy's murder against businessman Clay Shaw; Shaw was acquitted. Subsequent federal investigations—such as the Rockefeller Commission and Church Committee—agreed with the Warren Commission's general findings. In its 1979 report, the United States House Select Committee on Assassinations (HSCA) concluded that Kennedy was likely "assassinated as a result of a conspiracy". The HSCA did not identify possible conspirators, but concluded that there was "a high probability that two gunmen fired at [the] President". The HSCA's conclusions were largely based on a police Dictabelt recording, which was subsequently debunked by the U.S. Justice Department.

Kennedy's assassination is still the subject of widespread debate and has spawned many conspiracy theories and alternative scenarios; polls have found that a majority of Americans believe there was a conspiracy. The assassination left a profound impact and was the first of four major assassinations during the 1960s in the United States, coming two years before the assassination of Malcolm X in 1965, and five years before the assassinations of Martin Luther King Jr. and Kennedy's brother Robert F. Kennedy in 1968. Kennedy was the fourth U.S. president to be assassinated and is the most recent to have died in office.

== Background ==
=== Kennedy ===
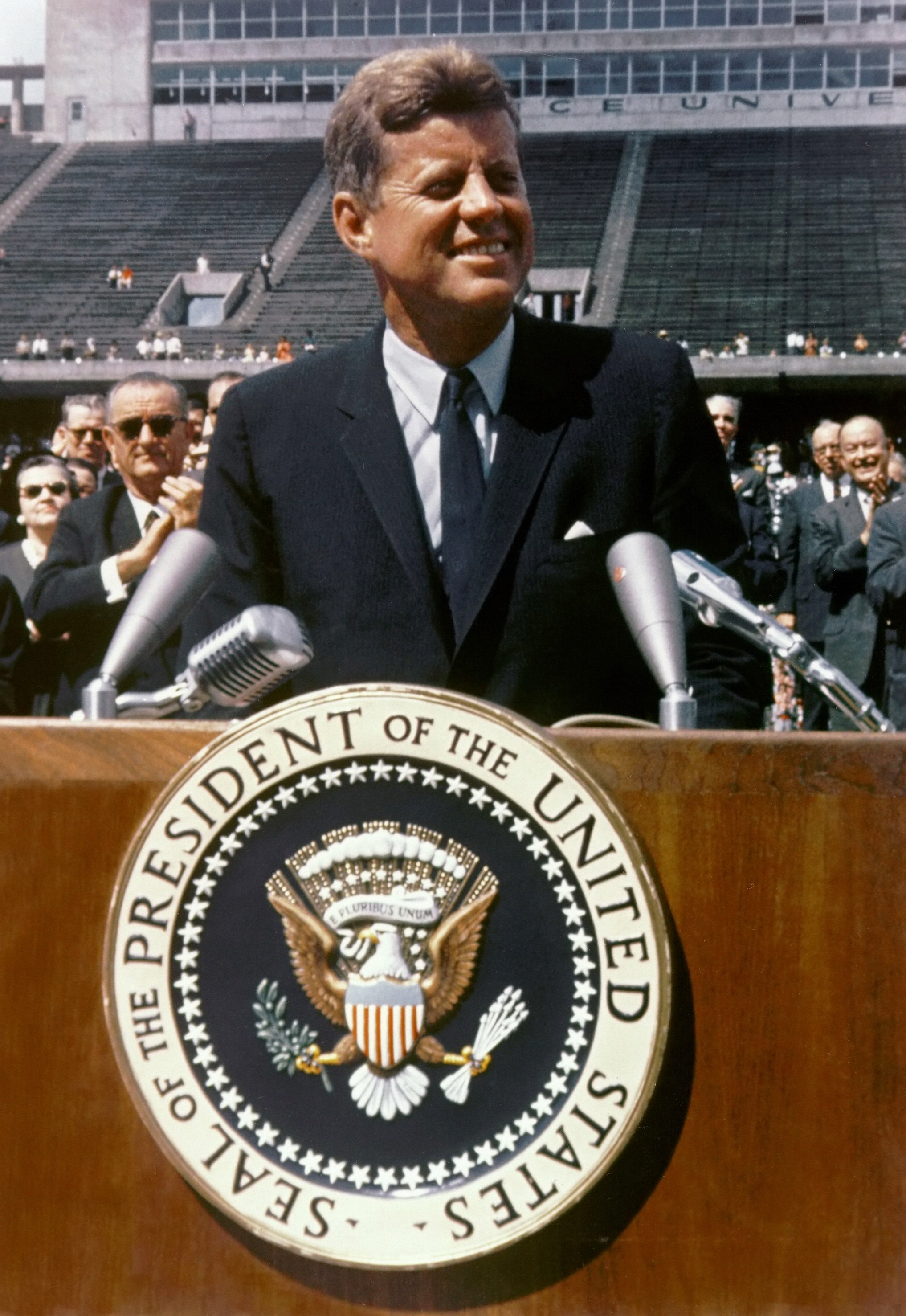
Kennedy delivering his "We choose to go to the Moon" speech at Rice University, 1962

In 1960, John F. Kennedy, then a U.S. senator from Massachusetts, was elected the 35th president of the United States with Lyndon B. Johnson as his vice president. Kennedy's tenure saw the height of the Cold War, and much of his foreign policy was dedicated to countering the Soviet Union and communism. As president, he authorized operations to overthrow Fidel Castro's communist government in Cuba, which culminated in the failed Bay of Pigs Invasion in 1961, during which he declined to directly involve American troops. The following year, Kennedy de-escalated the Cuban Missile Crisis, widely regarded as the closest that humanity has come to nuclear holocaust.

In 1963, Kennedy decided to travel to Texas to smooth over frictions within the state's Democratic Party between liberal U.S. senator Ralph Yarborough and conservative governor John Connally. The visit was first agreed upon by Kennedy, Johnson, and Connally during a meeting in El Paso in June. The motorcade route was finalized on November 18 and announced soon thereafter. Kennedy also viewed the Texas trip as an informal launch of his 1964 reelection campaign.

=== Oswald ===
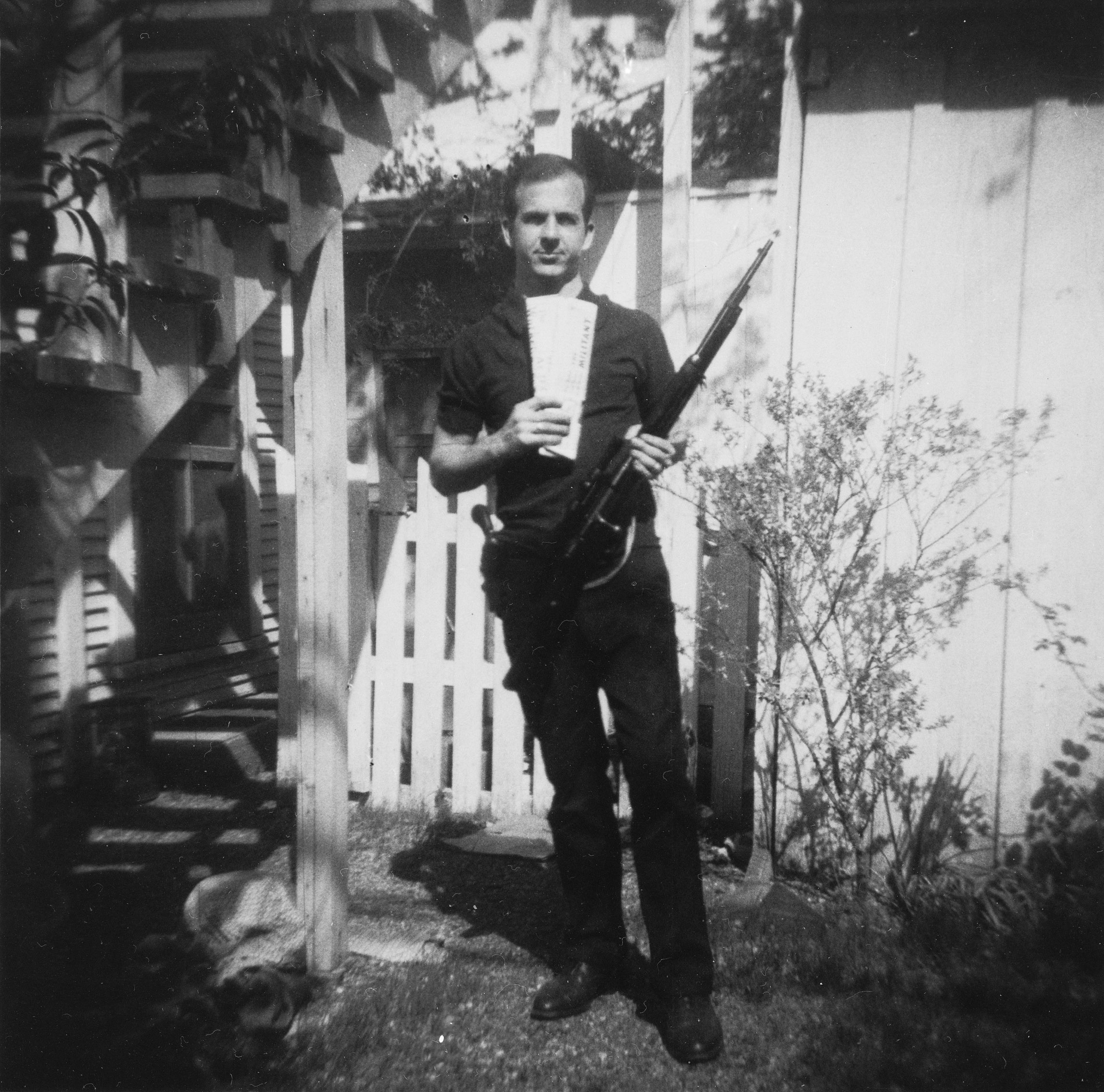
A photograph of Oswald posing with his rifle, a holstered pistol, and communist and socialist literature (Note: This photo and a similar one are known as the "backyard photographs"; according to Bugliosi, it is one of the pieces of evidence most damning for Oswald. Oswald told Dallas police that the photographs were not genuine and that someone must have superimposed his head. Marina Oswald testified that she took the pictures.)

Lee Harvey Oswald (born October 18, 1939) was a former U.S. Marine who had served in Japan and the Philippines, and had espoused communist and socialist beliefs since reading Karl Marx aged 14. After accidentally shooting his elbow with an unauthorized handgun and fighting an officer, Oswald was court-martialed twice and demoted. In September 1959, he received a dependency discharge after claiming his mother was disabled. A 19-year-old Oswald sailed on a freighter from New Orleans to France and then traveled to Finland, where he was issued a Soviet visa.

Oswald defected to the Soviet Union, (Note: In 1964, KGB Agent Yuri Nosenko defected to the United States. He divulged that Soviet intelligence surveilled Oswald, regarded him as mentally unstable, and had no association with him. Although the FBI trusted Nosenko, the CIA believed that he was a mole and convinced the Warren Commission not to interview him.) and in January 1960 he was sent to work at a factory in Minsk, Belarus. In 1961, he met and married Marina Prusakova, with whom he had a child. In 1962, he returned to the United States with a repatriation loan from the U.S. embassy. He settled in the Dallas/Fort Worth area, where he socialized with Russian émigrés—notably George de Mohrenschildt, a CIA informant. In March 1963, a bullet narrowly missed General Edwin Walker at his Dallas residence; a witness observed two conspicuous men. Relying on Marina's testimony, a note left by Oswald, and ballistic evidence, the Warren Commission attributed this assassination attempt to Oswald.

In April 1963, Oswald returned to his birthplace, New Orleans, and established an independent chapter of the pro-Castro Fair Play for Cuba Committee, of which he was the sole member. While passing out pro-Castro literature alongside unknown compatriots, Oswald was arrested after scuffling with anti-Castro Cuban exiles. (Note: At Oswald's request, he met with FBI Special Agent John Quigley while in custody. Posner cites this as proof that Oswald was not a government agent, questioning why he might "blow his cover".) In late September 1963, Oswald traveled to Mexico City, where, according to the Warren Commission, he visited the Soviet and Cuban embassies. On October 3, Oswald returned to Dallas and found work at the Texas School Book Depository on Dealey Plaza. During the workweek he lived separately from Marina at a Dallas rooming house. On the morning of the assassination, he carried a long package (which he told coworkers contained curtain rods) into the depository; (Note: Jack Dougherty, the only witness who saw Oswald enter the Depository on the morning of the assassination, testified to the Warren Commission that he did not remember seeing Oswald with any package. Bugliosi questioned his reliability as a witness: Dougherty's father told FBI agents on November 23 that his son "had considerable difficulty in coordinating his mental facilities with his speech".) the Warren Commission concluded that this package contained Oswald's disassembled rifle.

== November 22 ==
=== Kennedy's arrival in Dallas and route to Dealey Plaza ===
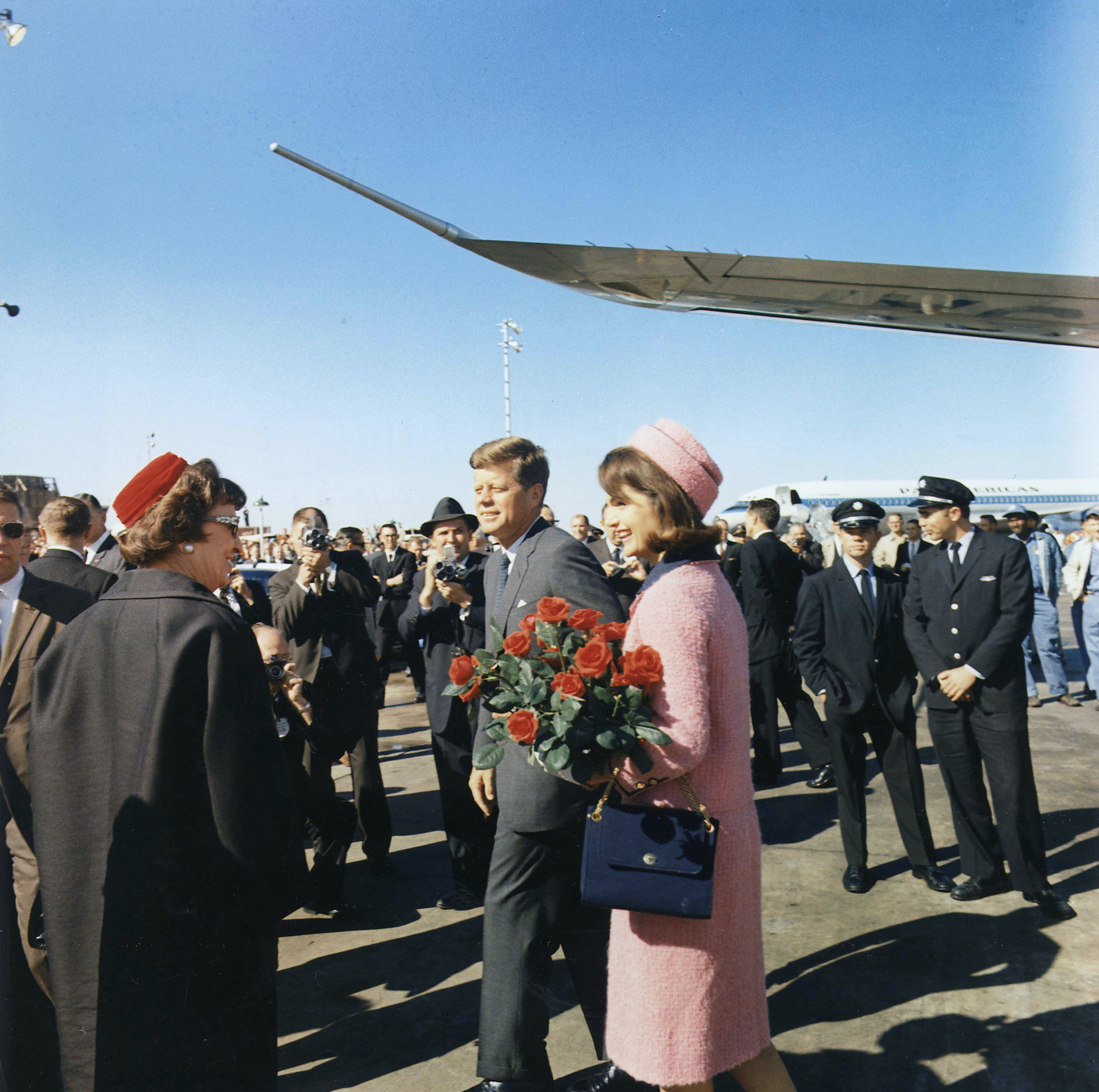
President Kennedy and First Lady Jacqueline Kennedy arriving at Dallas Love Field on November 22, 1963

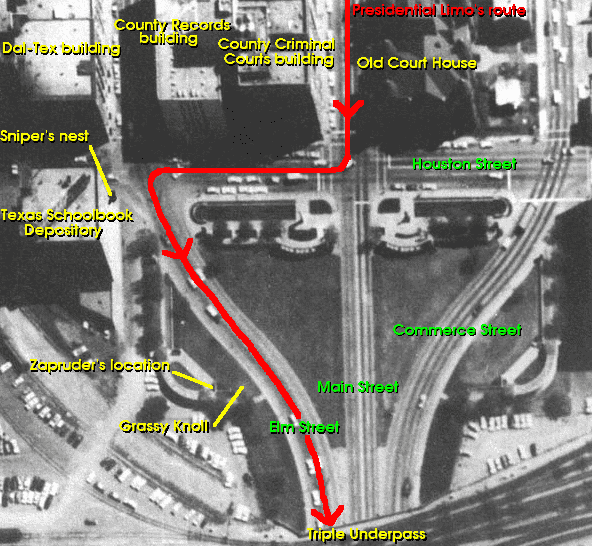
The route of Kennedy's motorcade through Dealey Plaza. The shooting occurred on Elm Street.

On the evening of November 21, Air Force One touched down in Fort Worth, Texas at 11:07 pm. The President and First Lady arrived at the Hotel Texas in downtown Fort Worth at 11:35 pm. The following morning, November 22, President Kennedy and the First Lady boarded a 1961 Lincoln Continental convertible limousine to travel to a luncheon at the Dallas Trade Mart. Other occupants of this vehicle—the second in the motorcade—were Secret Service Agent Bill Greer, who drove, Special Agent Roy Kellerman in the front passenger seat, and Governor Connally and his wife Nellie, who sat just forward of the Kennedys. Four Dallas police motorcycle officers accompanied the Kennedy limousine. Vice President Johnson, his wife Lady Bird, and Senator Yarborough rode in another convertible.

The motorcade's meandering 10-mile (16 km) route through Dallas was designed to give Kennedy maximum exposure to crowds by passing through a suburban section of Dallas, and Main Street in Downtown Dallas, before turning right on Houston Street. After another block, the motorcade was to turn left onto Elm Street, pass through Dealey Plaza, and travel a short segment of the Stemmons Freeway to the Trade Mart. The planned route had been reported in newspapers several days in advance. Despite concerns about hostile protestors—Kennedy's UN ambassador Adlai Stevenson had been spat on in Dallas a month earlier—Kennedy was greeted warmly by enthusiastic crowds.

=== Shooting ===
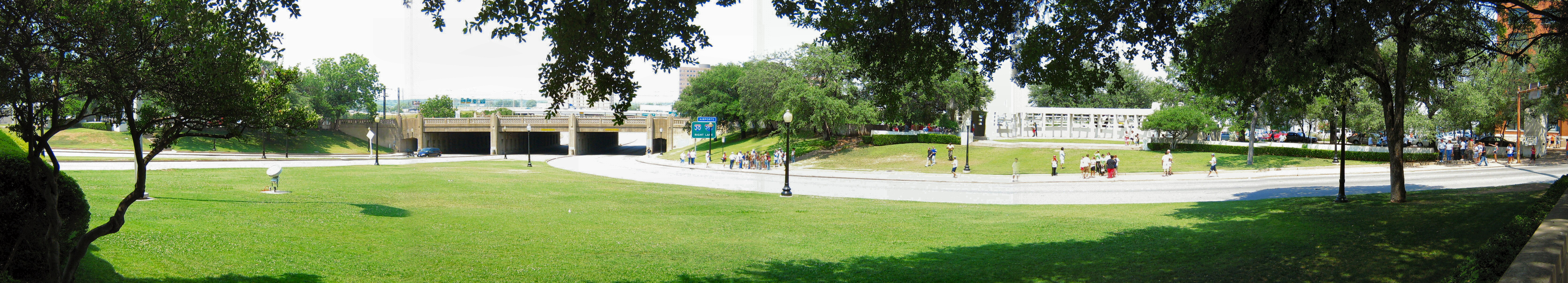
Dealey Plaza in 2006, with Elm Street on the right and the Triple Underpass on the left. The white concrete pergola, from which Zapruder was filming, is at the center, behind the lamp-post, and the Grassy Knoll is slightly to its left. The red building partially visible at the extreme upper right is the Texas School Book Depository. Kennedy's motorcade moved from right to left, and Kennedy was struck by the final bullet just left of the lamp-post in front of the pergola.
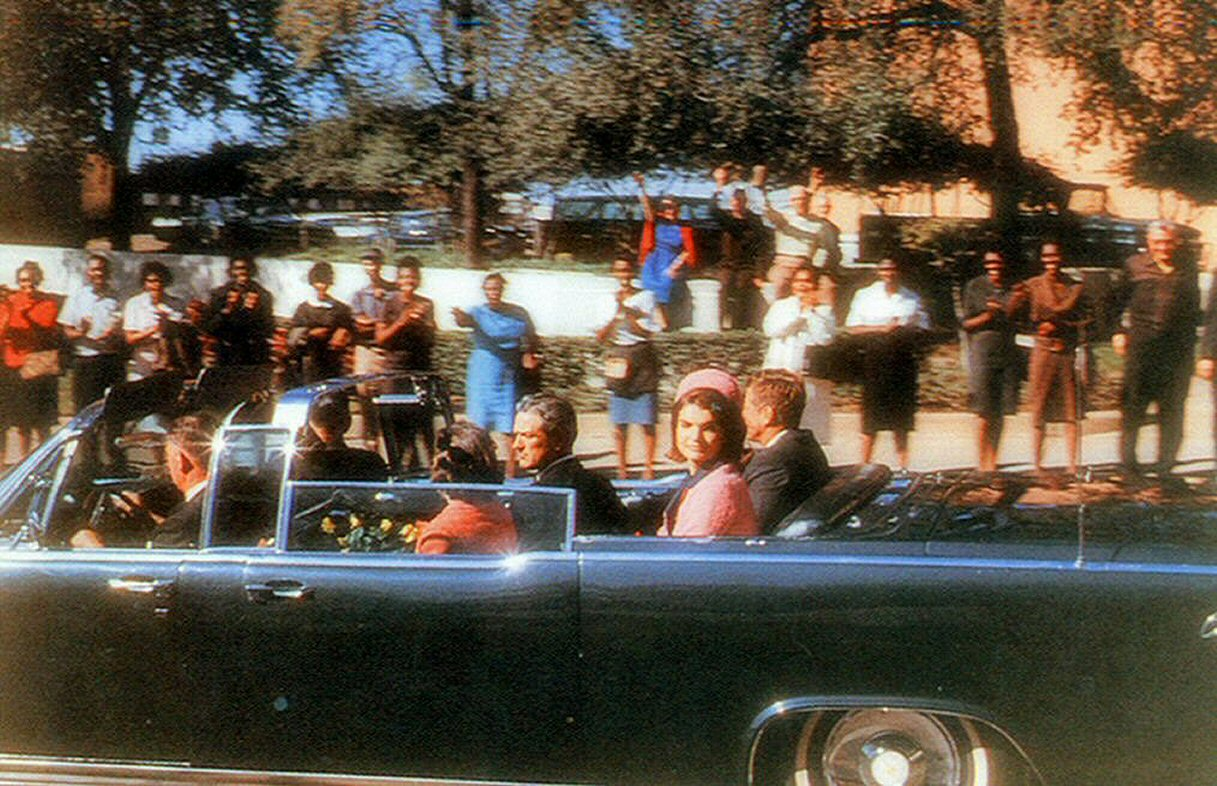
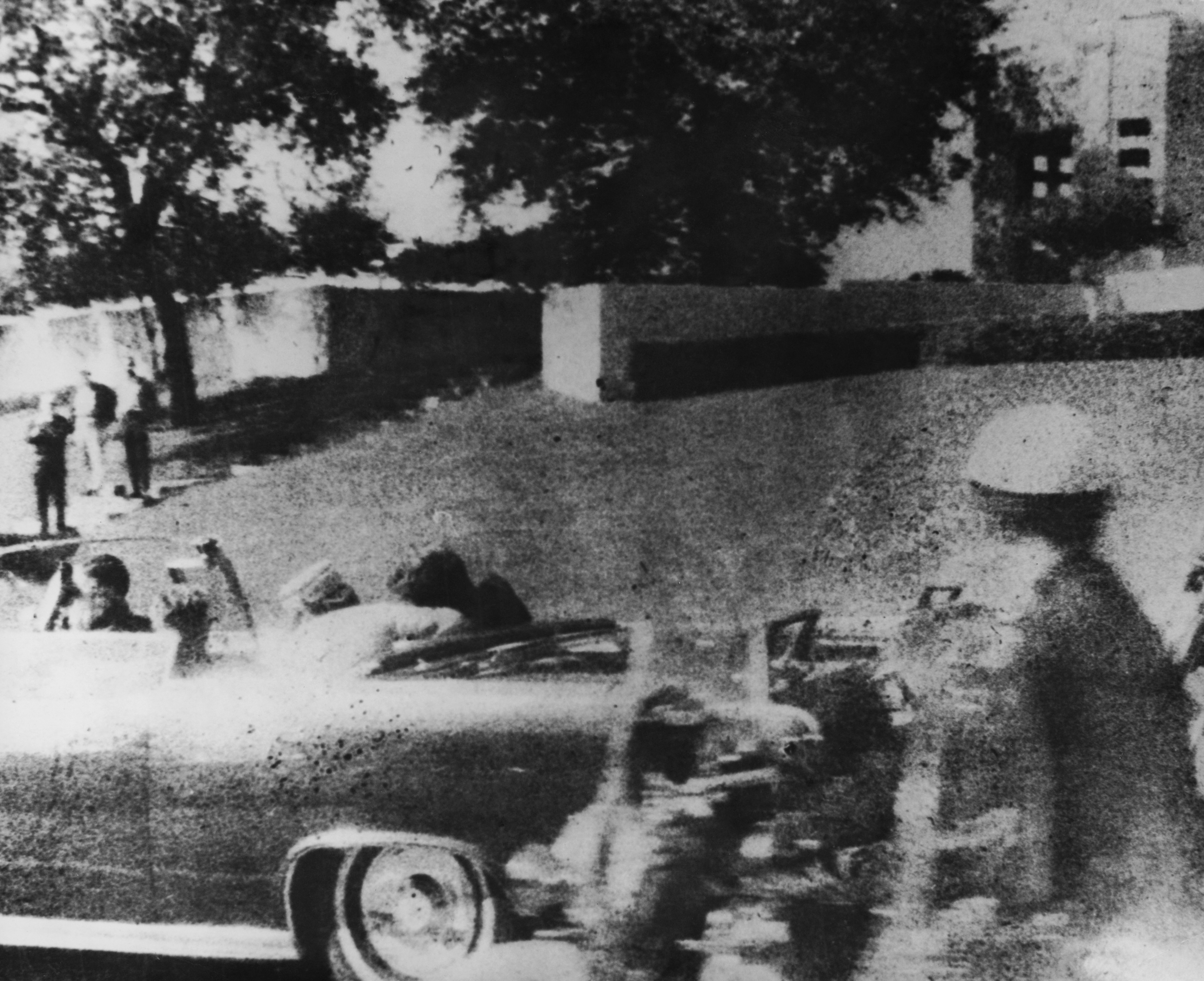
Robert Croft's photograph of Kennedy in Dealey Plaza, before the first shot struck Kennedy (color photo), and the Mary Moorman photograph (b&w photo), taken a fraction of a second after the fatal shot

Kennedy's limousine entered Dealey Plaza at 12:30 pm CST. Nellie Connally turned and commented to Kennedy, who was sitting behind her, "Mr. President, they can't make you believe now that there are not some in Dallas who love and appreciate you, can they?" Kennedy's reply—"No, they sure can't"—were his last words.

From Houston Street, the limousine made the planned left turn onto Elm, passing the Texas School Book Depository. As it continued down Elm Street, multiple shots were fired: about 80% of the witnesses recalled hearing three shots. The Warren Commission concluded that three shots were fired and noted that most witnesses recalled that the second and third shots were bunched together. Shortly after Kennedy began waving, some witnesses heard the first gunshot, but few in the crowd or motorcade reacted, many interpreting the sound as a firecracker or backfire. (Note: After the first shot, witness Virgie Rachley—an employee at the Texas School Book Depository—reported seeing sparks on the pavement shortly behind the president's limousine.)

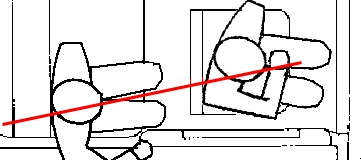
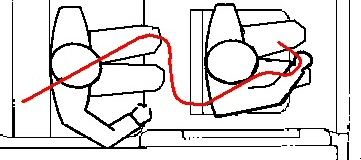
Per the Warren Commission's single-bullet theory (top), one bullet caused Kennedy's nonfatal wound and Connally's wounds. Conspiracy theorists, neglecting that Kennedy was not directly behind Connally, claim that the trajectory required a "magic bullet" (bottom).

Within one second of each other, Governor Connally and Mrs. Kennedy turned abruptly from their left to their right. Connally—an experienced hunter—immediately recognized the sound as that of a rifle and turned his head and torso rightward, noting nothing unusual behind him. He testified that he could not see Kennedy, so he started to turn forward again (turning from his right to his left), and that when his head was facing about 20 degrees left of center, he was struck in his upper right back by a shot he did not hear, then shouted, "My God. They're going to kill us all!"

According to the Warren Commission and the HSCA, Kennedy was waving to the crowds on his right when a shot entered his upper back and exited his throat just beneath his larynx. He raised his elbows and clenched his fists in front of his face and neck, then leaned forward and leftward. Mrs. Kennedy, facing him, put her arms around him. Although a serious wound, it likely would have been survivable.

According to the Warren Commission's single-bullet theory—derided as the "magic bullet theory" by conspiracy theorists—Governor Connally was injured by the same bullet that exited Kennedy's neck. The bullet created an oval-shaped entry wound near Connally's shoulder, struck and destroyed several inches of his right fifth rib, and exited his chest just below his right nipple, puncturing and collapsing his lung. That same bullet then entered his arm just above his right wrist and shattered his right radius bone. The bullet exited just below the wrist at the inner side of his right palm and finally lodged in his left thigh.

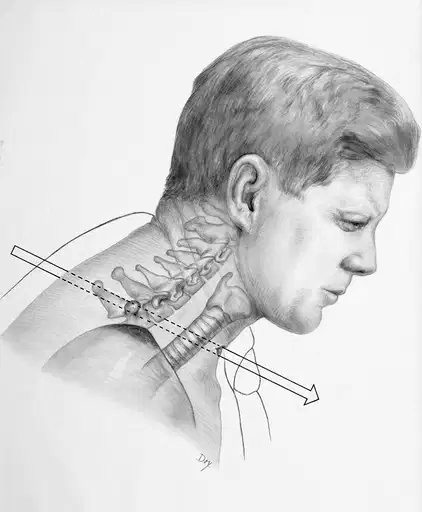
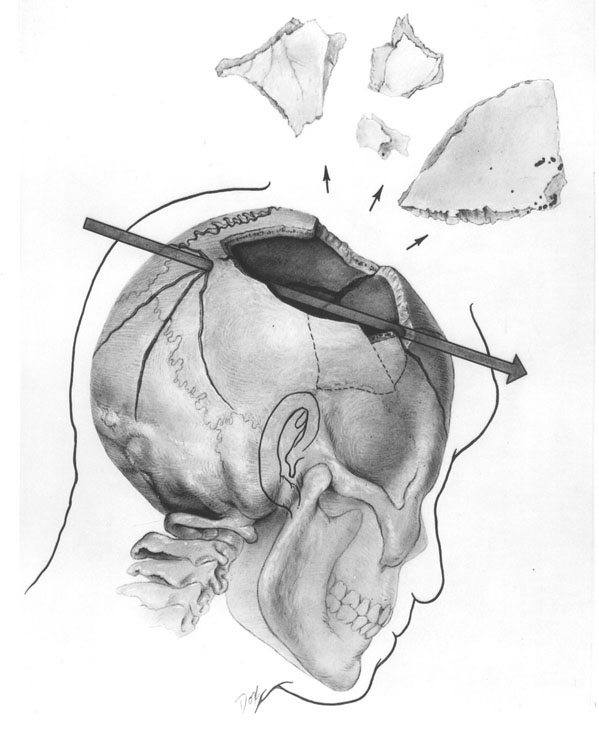
The trajectories of the two bullets that struck Kennedy, per the House Select Committee on Assassinations

As the limousine passed the grassy knoll, Kennedy was struck a second time by a fatal shot to the head. The Warren Commission made no finding as to whether this was the second or third bullet fired, and concluded—as did the HSCA—that the second shot to strike Kennedy entered the rear of his head. It then passed in fragments through his skull, creating a large, "roughly ovular" [sic] hole on the rear, right side of the head, and spraying blood and fragments. His brain and blood spatter landed as far as the following Secret Service car and the motorcycle officers. (Note: Student Billy Harper later found a fragment of Kennedy's skull on the road.)

Secret Service agent Clint Hill was riding on the running board of the car immediately behind Kennedy's limousine. Hill testified to the Warren Commission that he heard one shot, jumped onto the street, and ran forward to board the limousine and protect Kennedy. Hill stated that he heard the fatal headshot as he reached the Lincoln, "approximately five seconds" after the first shot that he heard. After the headshot, Mrs. Kennedy began climbing onto the limousine's trunk, but she later had no recollection of doing so. Hill believed she may have been reaching for a piece of Kennedy's skull. He jumped onto the limousine's bumper, and he clung to the car as it exited Dealey Plaza and sped to Parkland Memorial Hospital. After Mrs. Kennedy crawled back into her seat, both Governor and Mrs. Connally heard her repeatedly saying: "They have killed my husband. I have his brains in my hand."

Bystander James Tague received a minor wound to the cheek—either from a bullet or concrete curb fragments—while standing by the triple underpass. Nine months later, the FBI removed the curb, and spectrographic analysis revealed metallic residue consistent with the lead core in Oswald's ammunition. Tague testified before the Warren Commission and initially stated that he was wounded by either the second or third shot of the three shots that he remembered hearing. When the commission counsel pressed him to be more specific, Tague testified that he was wounded by the second shot.

=== Aftermath in Dealey Plaza ===
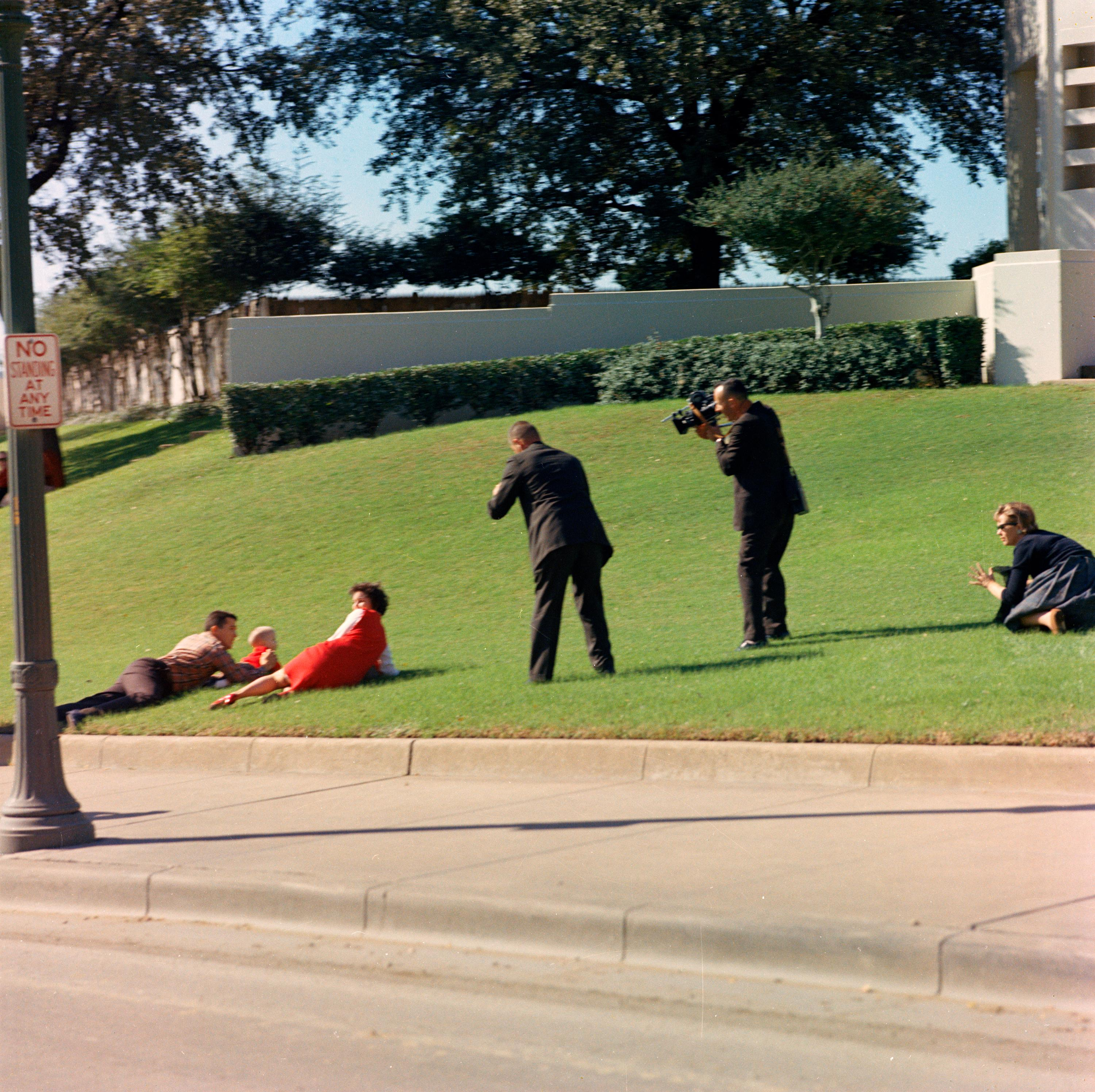
Civilians shielding their children after hearing shots and dropping to the grass. The grassy knoll and its picket fence are visible in the background. (Note: The journalists pictured with them arrived as the end of the motorcade passed through Dealey Plaza.)

As the motorcade left Dealey Plaza, some witnesses sought cover, and others joined police officers to run up the grassy knoll in search of a shooter. No shooter was found behind the knoll's picket fence. Among the 178 witnesses who testified to the Warren Commission, 78 were unsure of the shots' origin, 49 believed they came from the depository, and 21 thought they came from the grassy knoll. No witness ever reported seeing anyone—with or without a gun—immediately behind the knoll's picket fence at the time of the shooting.

Lee Bowers was in a two-story railroad switch tower 120 yards (110 m) behind the grassy knoll's picket fence; he was watching the motorcade and had an unobstructed view of the only route by which a shooter could flee the grassy knoll; he saw no one leaving the scene. Bowers testified to the Warren Commission that "one or two" men were between him and the fence during the assassination: one was a familiar parking lot attendant, and the other wore a uniform like a county courthouse custodian. He testified seeing "some commotion" on the grassy knoll at the time of the assassination: "something out of the ordinary, a sort of milling around, but something occurred in this particular spot which was out of the ordinary, which attracted my eye for some reason which I could not identify". (Note: Bugliosi notes that Lee Bowers Jr. did not mention the "commotion" in an earlier affidavit, in which Bowers did take time to list all other suspicious happenings like circling vehicles with "Goldwater for '64" stickers. Moreover, conspiracy theorist Jim Moore questions whether Bowers could even have seen the area. Bowers testified that he "threw [the] red-on-red [signal]" just after the fatal shot, but the grassy knoll was partially obstructed from Bowers' position at the work panel.)

At 12:36 pm, teenager Amos Euins approached Dallas police sergeant D. V. Harkness to report having seen a "colored man ... leaning out of the window [with] a rifle" on the sixth floor of the depository during the assassination; in response, Harkness radioed that he was sealing off the depository. Witness Howard Brennan then approached a police inspector to report seeing a shooter—a white man in khaki clothing—in the same window. Police broadcast Brennan's description of the man at 12:45 pm. Brennan testified that, after the second shot, "This man ... was aiming for his last shot ... and maybe paused for another second as though to assure himself that he had hit his mark." Witness James R. Worrell Jr. also reported seeing a gun barrel emerge from a sixth-floor depository window. Bonnie Ray Williams, who was on the fifth floor of the depository, stated that the rifle's report was so loud and near that the ceiling plaster fell onto his head.

=== Oswald's flight, murder of J. D. Tippit, and arrest ===
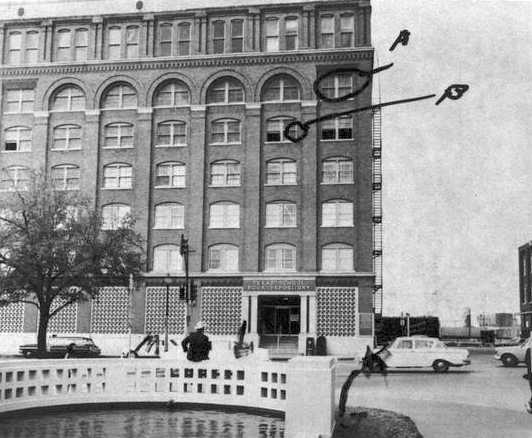
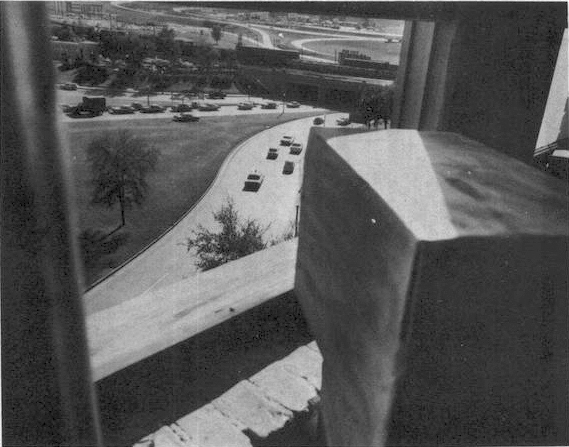
The view of the Texas School Book Depository from witness Howard Brennan: circle "A" indicates where he saw Oswald firing a rifle. At right, the view from the "sniper's nest" in the Texas School Book Depository.

When searching the sixth floor of the depository, two deputies found an Italian Carcano M91/38 bolt-action rifle. (Note: Three spent cartridges were found on the floor. One live round was found in the rifle. Dallas policemen thoroughly photographed the rifle before its removal.) Oswald had purchased the used rifle the previous March under the alias "A. Hidell" and had it delivered to his Dallas P.O. box. The FBI found Oswald's partial palm print on the barrel, (Note: Lieutenant Day of the Dallas police examined the weapon before its seizure by the FBI. He found and photographed fingerprints on the trigger housing. Although Day believed the prints to be those of Oswald's right middle and ring fingers, the ridges were not clear enough to make an identification. Day then discovered a palm print on the barrel underneath the wooden stock. He tentatively identified it as Oswald's, but was not able to photograph or analyze it in more depth as the FBI took the Carcano. In D.C., FBI fingerprint expert Sebastian Latona found the photographs and extant prints to be "insufficient" to make any conclusion. The rifle was returned to the Dallas police on November 24. Five days later, the FBI made an identification using a card from Day.) and fibers on the rifle were consistent with those of Oswald's shirt. A bullet found on Governor Connally's hospital gurney and two fragments found in the limousine were ballistically matched to the Carcano.

Oswald left the depository and traveled by bus to his boarding house, where he retrieved a jacket and revolver. At 1:12 pm, police officer J. D. Tippit spotted Oswald walking in the residential neighborhood of Oak Cliff and called him to his patrol car. After an exchange of words, Tippit exited his vehicle; Oswald then shot Tippit three times in the chest. As Tippit lay on the ground, Oswald fired a final shot into Tippit's right temple. Oswald then calmly walked away before running as witnesses emerged.

Oswald speaking in custody
- Oswald professing innocence
- Oswald's "press conference"

As Dallas police officers conducted a roll call of depository employees, Oswald's supervisor, Roy Truly, realized that Oswald was absent and notified the police. Based on a false identification of Oswald, Dallas police raided a library in Oak Cliff before realizing their mistake. At 1:36 pm, the police were called after a conspicuous Oswald, tired from running, was seen sneaking into the Texas Theatre without paying. With the film War Is Hell still playing, Dallas policemen arrested Oswald after a brief struggle in which Oswald drew his fully loaded gun. He denied shooting anyone and claimed he was being made a "patsy" because he had lived in the Soviet Union.

=== Kennedy declared dead; Johnson sworn in ===
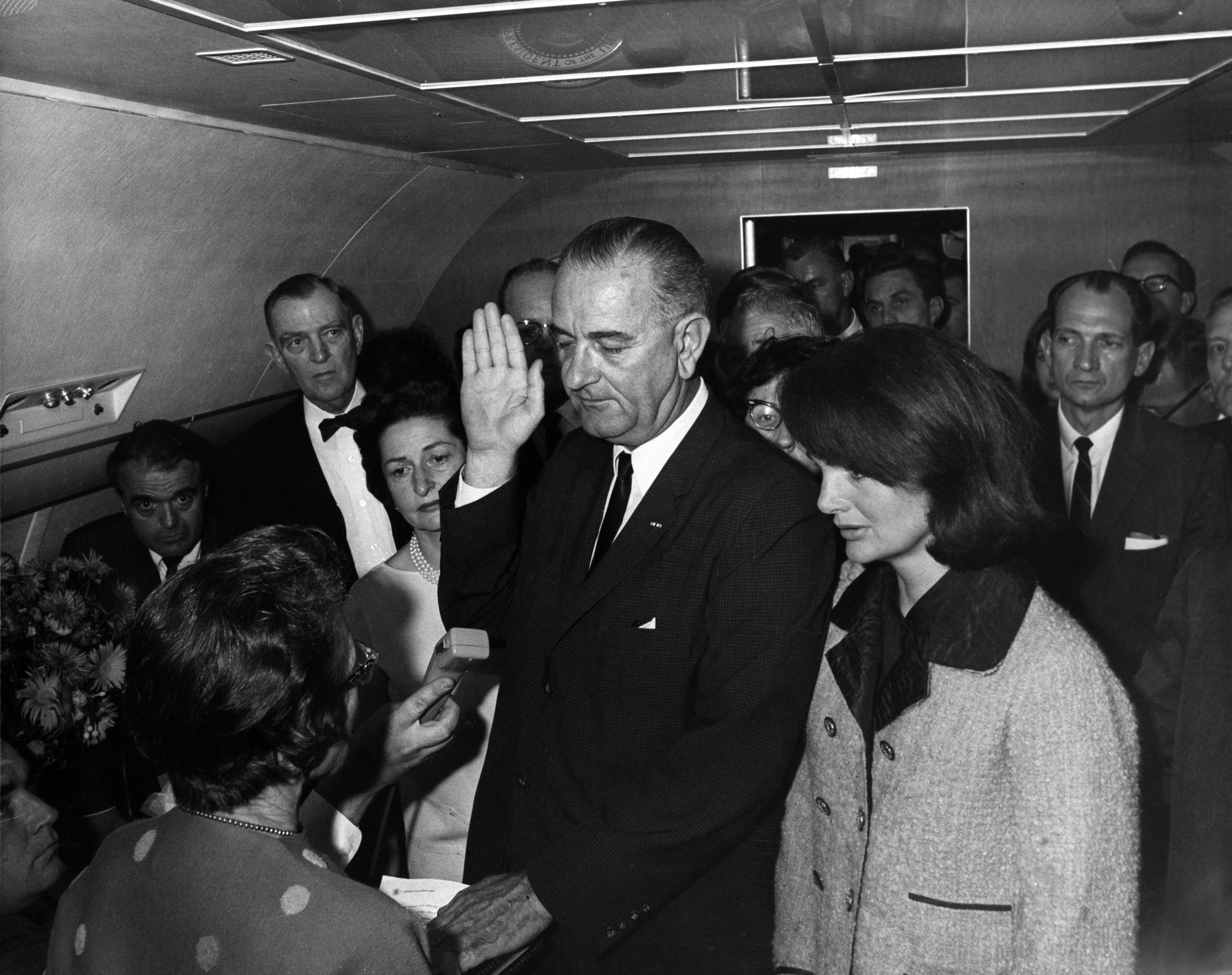
Cecil W. Stoughton's photograph of Lyndon B. Johnson being sworn in as President as Air Force One prepares to depart Love Field in Dallas. Jacqueline Kennedy, still in her Chanel suit (the blood spatters not visible here), looks on.

At 12:38 pm, Kennedy arrived in the emergency room of Parkland Memorial Hospital. Although Kennedy was still breathing after the shooting, his personal physician, George Burkley, immediately saw that survival was impossible. After Parkland surgeons performed futile cardiac massage, Kennedy was pronounced dead at 1:00 pm, 30 minutes after the shooting. CBS host Walter Cronkite broke the news on live television.

The Secret Service was concerned about the possibility of a larger plot and urged Johnson to leave Dallas and return to the White House, but Johnson refused to do so without any proof of Kennedy's death. (Note: At the time of Kennedy's assassination, most of his cabinet was on a trip to Japan.) Johnson returned to Air Force One around 1:30 p.m, and shortly thereafter, he received telephone calls from advisors McGeorge Bundy and Walter Jenkins advising him to depart for Washington, D.C., immediately. He replied that he would not leave Dallas without Jacqueline Kennedy and that she would not leave without Kennedy's body. According to Esquire, Johnson did "not want to be remembered as an abandoner of beautiful widows".

At the time of Kennedy's assassination, the murder of a president was not under federal jurisdiction. Accordingly, Dallas County medical examiner Earl Rose insisted that Texas law required him to perform an autopsy. A heated exchange between Kennedy's aides and Dallas officials nearly erupted into a fistfight before the Texans yielded and allowed Kennedy's body to be transported to Air Force One. At 2:38 pm, with Jacqueline Kennedy at his side, Johnson was administered the oath of office by federal judge Sarah Tilghman Hughes aboard Air Force One, shortly before departing for Washington with Kennedy's coffin.

== Immediate aftermath ==
=== Autopsy ===
Where bungled autopsies are concerned, President Kennedy's is the exemplar.

— Dr. Michael Baden, chairman of the forensic pathology panel of the House Select Committee on Assassinations

President Kennedy's autopsy was performed at Bethesda Naval Hospital in Maryland on the night of November 22. Jacqueline Kennedy had selected a naval hospital as the postmortem site, as President Kennedy had been a naval officer during World War II. The autopsy was conducted by three physicians: naval commanders James Humes and J. Thornton Boswell, with assistance from ballistics wound expert Pierre A. Finck; Humes led the procedure. Under pressure from the Kennedy family and White House staffers to expedite the procedure, the physicians conducted a "rushed" and incomplete autopsy. Kennedy's personal physician, Rear Admiral George Burkley, signed a death certificate on November 23 and recorded that the cause of death was a gunshot wound to the skull.

Three years after the autopsy, Kennedy's brain—which had been removed and preserved for later analysis—was found to be missing when the Kennedy family transferred material to the National Archives. Conspiracy theorists often claim that the brain may have shown that the headshot entered from the front. Alternatively, the HSCA concluded that an assistant to Attorney General Robert F. Kennedy, the president's brother, likely removed the footlocker holding the brain and other materials at his direction, and he "either destroyed these materials or otherwise rendered them inaccessible" to prevent "misuse" of said material or to hide the extent of the president's chronic illnesses and consequent medication. Some autopsy X-rays and photographs have also been lost.

Most historians regard the autopsy as the "most botched" segment of the government's investigation. The HSCA forensic pathology panel concluded that the autopsy had "extensive failings", including failure to take sufficient photographs, failure to determine the exact exit or entry point of the head bullet, not dissecting the back and neck, and neglecting to determine the angles of gunshot injuries relative to body axis. The panel further concluded that the two doctors were not qualified to have conducted a forensic autopsy. Panel member Milton Helpern—Chief Medical Examiner for New York City—said that selecting Humes (who had only taken a single course on forensic pathology) to lead the autopsy was "like sending a seven-year-old boy who has taken three lessons on the violin over to the New York Philharmonic and expecting him to perform a Tchaikovsky symphony".

=== Funeral ===
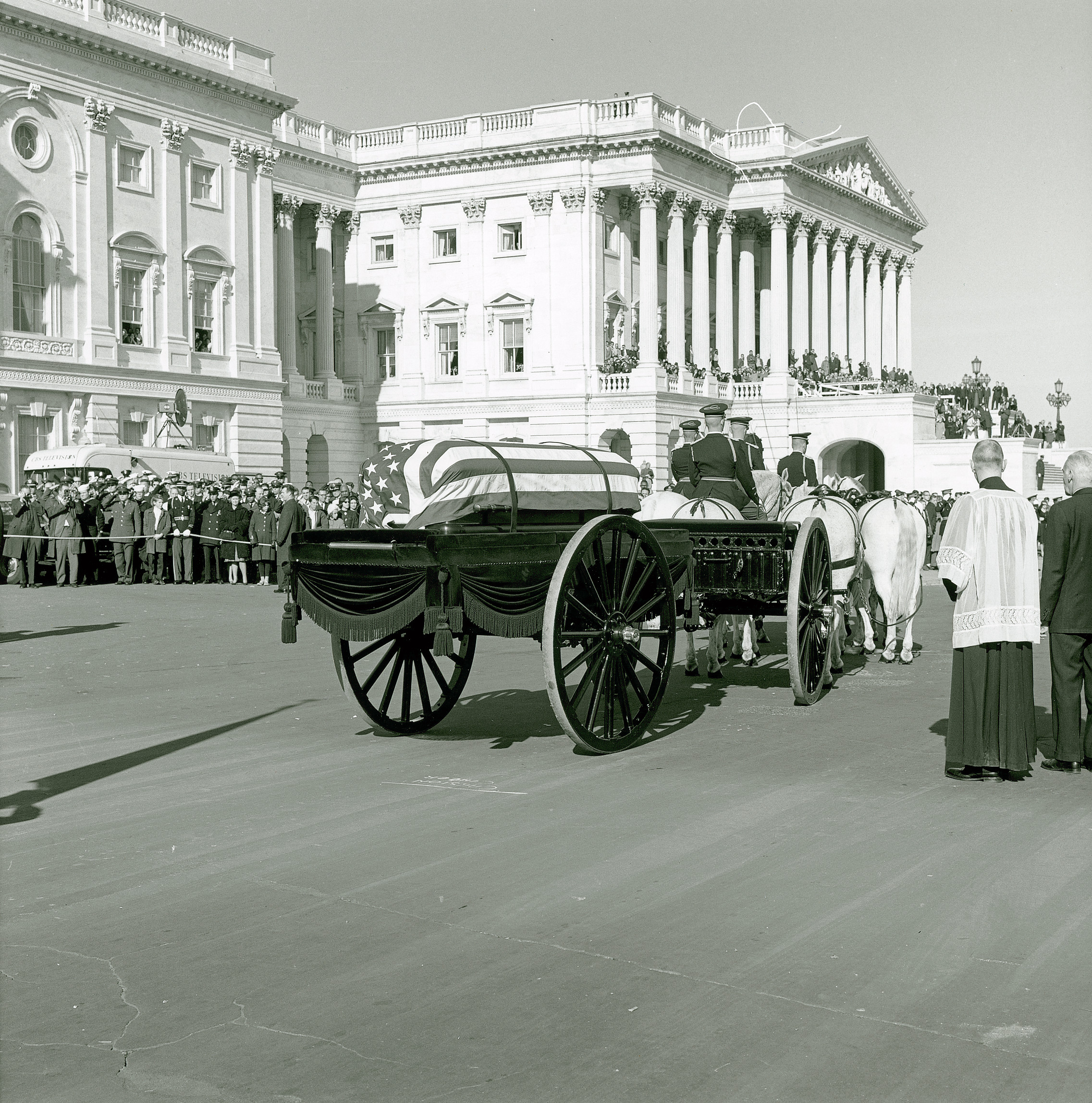
Kennedy's coffin is carried from the Capitol, November 25

Following the autopsy, Kennedy lay in repose in the East Room of the White House for 24 hours. President Johnson issued Presidential Proclamation 3561, declaring November 25 to be a national day of mourning, and that only essential emergency workers be at their posts. The coffin was then carried on a horse-drawn caisson to the Capitol to lie in state. Hundreds of thousands of mourners lined up to view the guarded casket, with a quarter million passing through the rotunda during the 18 hours of lying in state. Even in the Soviet Union, according to a memo by FBI director J. Edgar Hoover—news of the assassination "was greeted by great shock and consternation, and church bells were tolled in the memory of President Kennedy".

Kennedy's funeral service was held on November 25, at St. Matthew's Cathedral, with the Requiem Mass led by Cardinal Richard Cushing. About 1,200 guests, including representatives from over 90 countries, attended. Although there was no formal eulogy, Auxiliary Bishop Philip M. Hannan read excerpts from Kennedy's speeches and writings. After the service, Kennedy was buried at Arlington National Cemetery in Virginia. An eternal flame was lit at his burial site in 1967.

=== Murder of Oswald ===
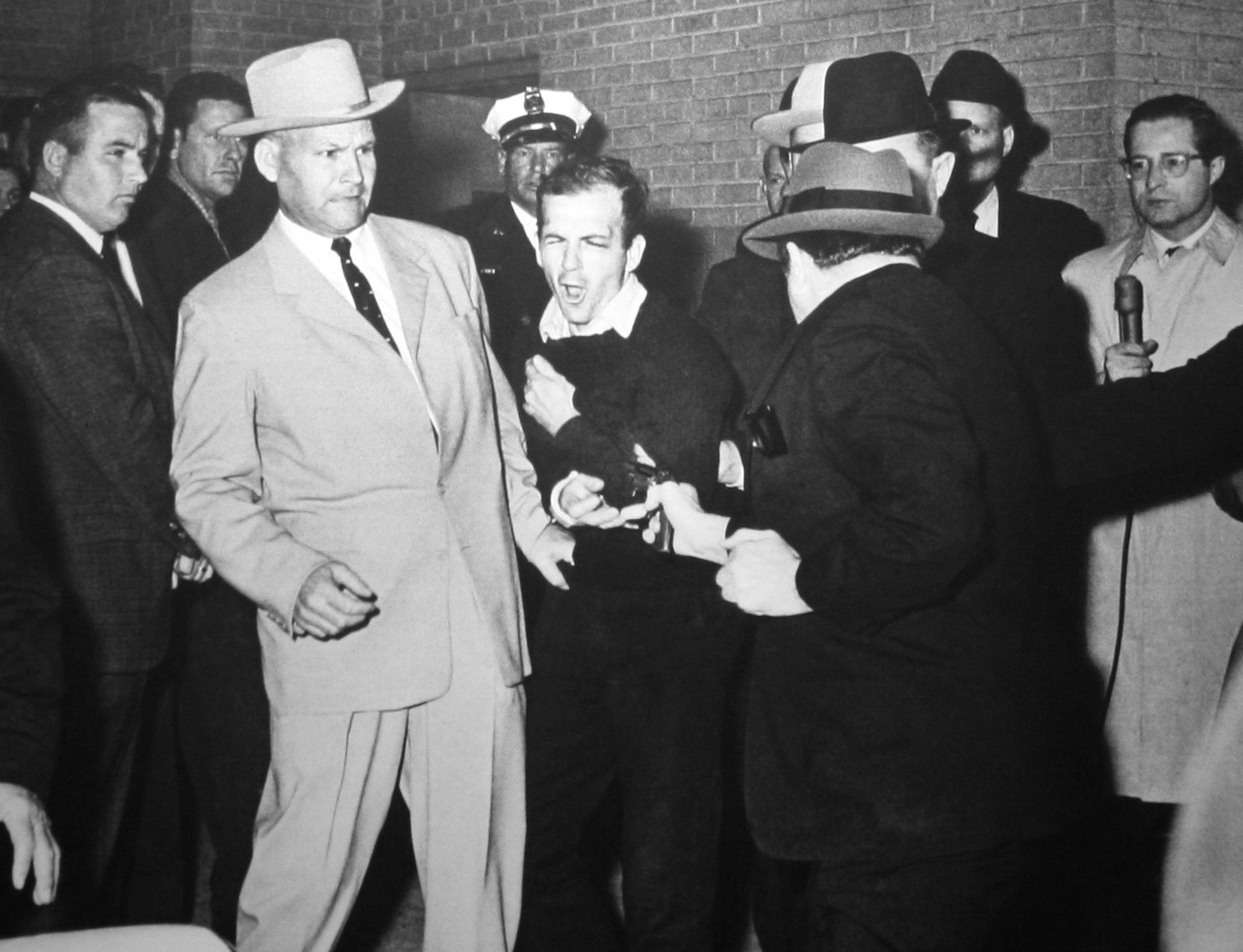
Robert H. Jackson's photograph Jack Ruby Shoots Lee Harvey Oswald. Oswald was being escorted by police detective Jim Leavelle (tan suit) for the transfer from the city jail to the county jail. Ruby died in prison in 1967.

On Sunday, November 24, at 11:21 am, as Oswald was being escorted to a car in the basement of Dallas Police headquarters for the transfer from the city jail to the county jail, he was shot by Dallas nightclub owner Jack Ruby. The shooting was broadcast live on television. Robert H. Jackson of the Dallas Times Herald photographed the shooting; for the photograph, titled Jack Ruby Shoots Lee Harvey Oswald, he was awarded the 1964 Pulitzer Prize for Photography.

Drifting in and out of consciousness, Oswald was taken by ambulance to Parkland Memorial Hospital; he was treated by the same surgeons who had tried to save Kennedy. The bullet had entered his lower left chest but had not exited; major heart blood vessels such as the aorta and inferior vena cava were severed, and the spleen, kidney, and liver were hit. Despite surgical intervention and defibrillation, Oswald died at 1:07 pm.

Arrested immediately after the shooting, Ruby testified to the Warren Commission that he had been distraught by Kennedy's death and that killing Oswald would spare "Mrs. Kennedy the discomfiture of coming back to trial". He also stated he shot Oswald on the spur of the moment when the opportunity presented itself, without considering any reason for doing so. Initially, Ruby wished to represent himself in his trial until his lawyer Melvin Belli dissuaded him: Belli argued that Ruby had an episode of psychomotor epilepsy and was thus not responsible. Ruby was convicted, but the decision was overturned on appeal. While awaiting retrial in 1967, Ruby died of a pulmonary embolism, secondary to cancer. Like Oswald and Kennedy, Ruby was declared dead at Parkland Hospital.

== Films and photographs of the assassination ==
My god, I saw the whole thing. I saw the man's brains come out of his head.

— Abraham Zapruder

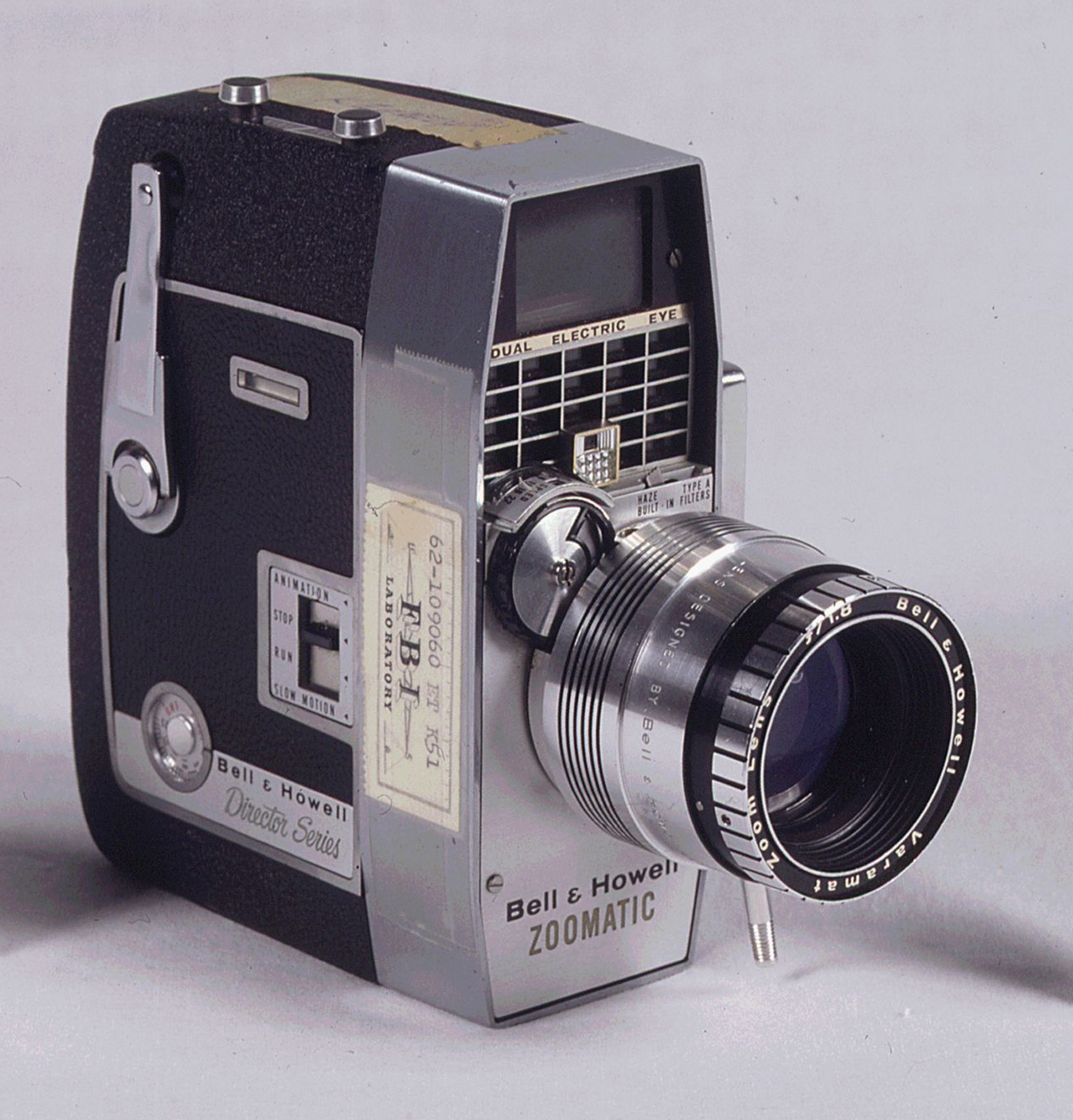
The Bell & Howell Zoomatic movie camera used by Abraham Zapruder to capture footage of the motorcade and Kennedy's killing, which later came to be known as the Zapruder film. The camera is preserved within the collection of the National Archives.

Standing on the pergola wall some 65 feet (20 m) from the road, tailor Abraham Zapruder recorded Kennedy's killing on 26 seconds of silent 8 mm film—known as the Zapruder film. Frame 313 captures the exact moment at which Kennedy's head explodes. Life magazine published frame enlargements from the Zapruder film shortly after the assassination. The footage itself was first publicly shown at the 1969 trial of Clay Shaw, and on television in 1975 by Geraldo Rivera. In 1999, an arbitration panel ordered the federal government to pay $615,384 per second of film to Zapruder's heirs, valuing the complete film at $16 million (equivalent to $31.7 million in 2026).

Zapruder was one of at least 32 people in Dealey Plaza known to have made film or still photographs at or around the time of the shooting. Most notably among the photographers, Mary Moorman took several photos of Kennedy with her Polaroid, including one of Kennedy less than one-sixth of a second after the headshot.

In addition to Zapruder, Charles Bronson, Marie Muchmore, and Orville Nix filmed the assassination, but at farther distances than Zapruder. Of the three, only Nix—who filmed the assassination from the opposite side of Elm Street from Zapruder, capturing the grassy knoll—actually recorded the fatal shot. (Note: Nix himself believed that the shots had come from the grassy knoll.) In 1966, Nix claimed that, after he gave the film to the FBI, the duplicate that they returned had frames "missing" or "ruined". Although lower-quality duplicates exist, the original film has been missing since 1978. Previously unknown footage filmed by George Jefferies was released in 2007. Recorded a few blocks before the shooting, the film captures Kennedy's bunched suit jacket, explaining the discrepancies between the location of the bullet hole in Kennedy's back and his jacket.

Some films and photographs captured an unidentified woman apparently filming the assassination; researchers have nicknamed her the Babushka Lady due to the shawl around her head. In 1978, Gordon Arnold came forward and claimed that he had filmed the assassination from the grassy knoll and that a police officer had confiscated his film. Arnold is not visible in any photographs taken of the area, which Vincent Bugliosi—author of Reclaiming History—called "conclusive photographic proof that Arnold's story was fabricated".

== Official investigations ==
=== Dallas Police ===
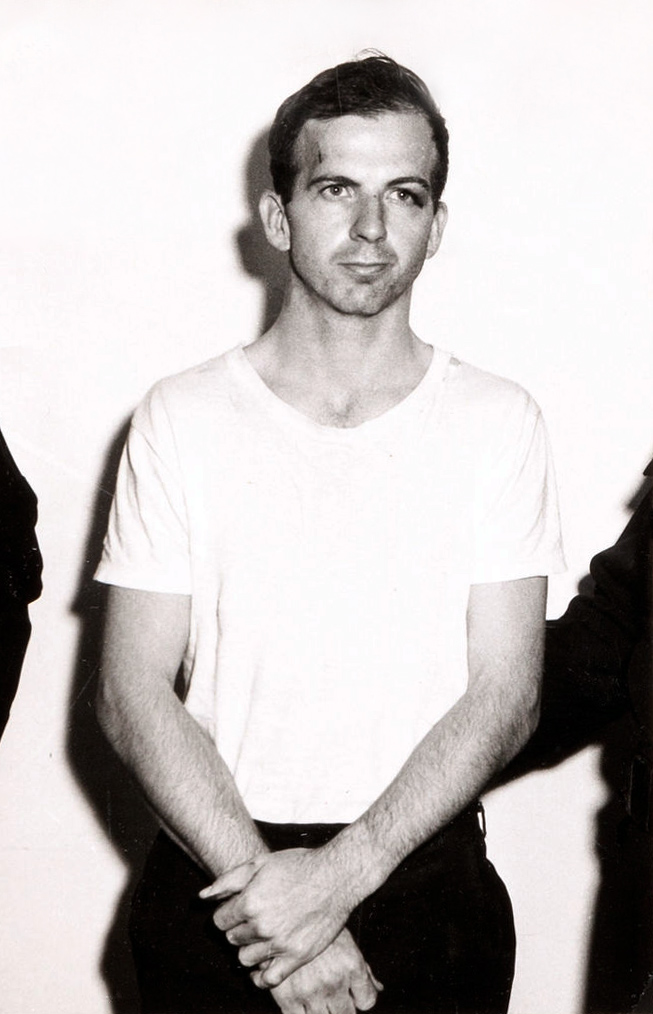
Lee Harvey Oswald in police custody

At the Dallas Police headquarters, officers interrogated Oswald about the shootings of Kennedy and Tippit; these intermittent interviews lasted for approximately 12 hours between 2:30 pm on November 22 and 11 am on November 24. Throughout, Oswald denied any involvement and resorted to statements that were found to be false.

Captain J. W. Fritz of the Homicide and Robbery Bureau did most of the questioning and kept only rudimentary notes. Days later, Fritz wrote a report of the interrogation from notes he made afterwards. There were no stenographic or tape recordings. Representatives of other law enforcement agencies were also present, including the FBI and the Secret Service, and occasionally participated in the questioning. Several of the FBI agents who were present wrote contemporaneous reports of the interrogation.

On the evening of November 22, Dallas Police performed paraffin tests on Oswald's hands and right cheek in an effort to establish whether or not he had recently fired a weapon. The results were positive for the hands and negative for the right cheek. Such tests were unreliable, and the Warren Commission did not rely on these results.

The Dallas police forced Oswald to host a press conference after midnight on November 23, and, early in the investigation, made many leaks to the media. Their conduct angered Johnson, who instructed the FBI to tell them to "stop talking about the assassination". Dallas Police, after the FBI expressed concerns that someone might try to kill Oswald, assured federal authorities that they would provide him adequate protection.

=== FBI investigation ===
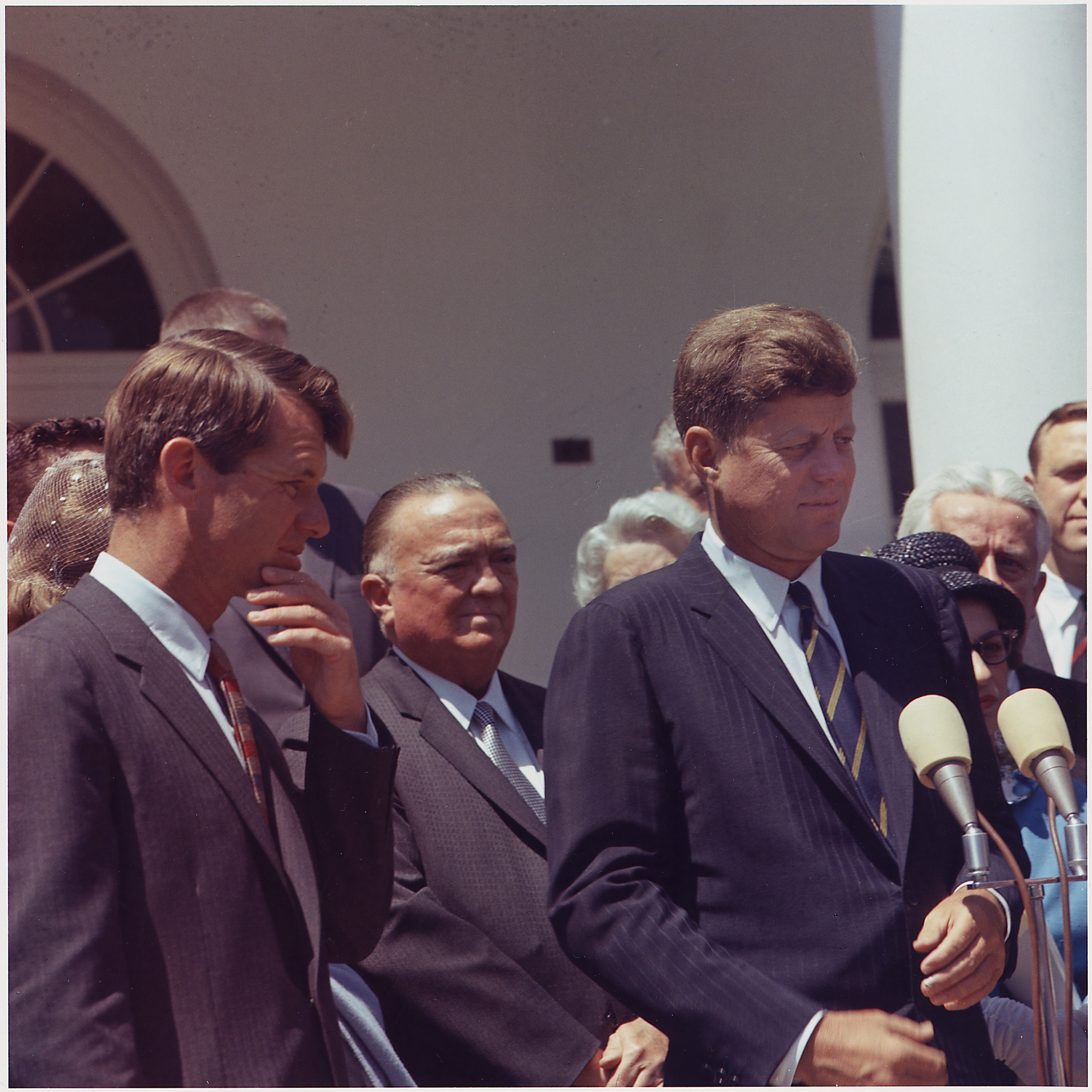
FBI Director J. Edgar Hoover (pictured between Robert and John F. Kennedy in May 1963) wrote in a 1964 memo that "we left no stone unturned".

The FBI immediately launched an investigation into the assassination, relying on a federal statute that forbade assaulting a federal officer. Within 24 hours of the killing, FBI Director Hoover sent President Johnson a preliminary report finding that Oswald was the sole culprit. After Ruby killed Oswald, Johnson decided that the Texas authorities were incompetent and instructed the FBI to conduct a complete investigation.

On December 9, 1963, the Warren Commission received the FBI's report of its investigation, which concluded that three bullets had been fired‍—‌the first striking Kennedy in the upper back, the second striking Connally, and the third striking Kennedy in the head, killing him. The FBI continued to serve as the main investigative arm of the Warren Commission in the field. A total of 169 FBI agents worked on the case, conducting over 25,000 interviews and writing over 2,300 reports.

The thoroughness of the FBI's investigation is contested. Bugliosi applauded its quality and cites conspiracy theorist Harrison Edward Livingstone's praise of the FBI's commitment to following all leads. In its 1979 report, the HSCA found that the FBI's investigation of pro- and anti-Castro Cubans, and any connections to Oswald or Ruby, was insufficient. The HSCA also noted that Hoover "seemed determined [to make the case that Oswald was the lone assassin] within 24 hours of the assassination".

=== Warren Commission ===
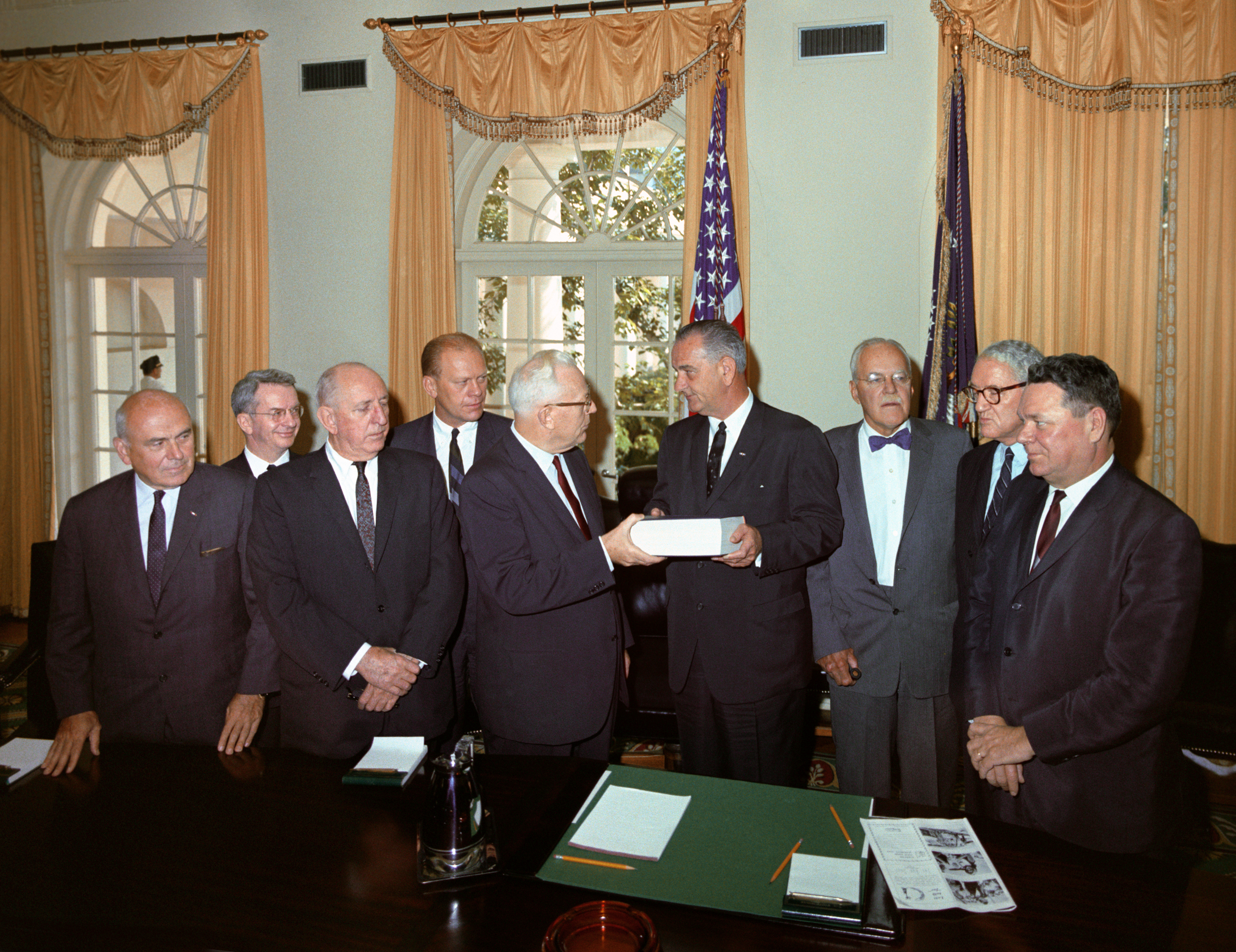
The Warren Commission presents its report to President Johnson. From left to right: John McCloy, J. Lee Rankin (General Counsel), Senator Richard Russell, Congressman Gerald Ford, Chief Justice Earl Warren, President Lyndon B. Johnson, Allen Dulles, Senator John Sherman Cooper, and Congressman Hale Boggs

On November 29, President Johnson established by executive order "The President's Commission on the Assassination of President Kennedy" and selected Chief Justice Earl Warren of the U.S. Supreme Court to chair the investigation, commonly known as the Warren Commission. Its 888-page final report was presented to Johnson on September 24, 1964, and made public three days later. It concluded that Lee Harvey Oswald had acted alone in killing Kennedy and wounding Connally, and that Jack Ruby acted alone in killing Oswald. It made no conclusions as to Oswald's motive, but noted his Marxism, anti-authoritarianism, violent tendencies, failure to form personal relationships, and his desire to be significant in history.

Upon examining the Zapruder film, commission staffers realized that the FBI's gunshot theory was impossible. The reaction times of Kennedy and Connally were too close to have been caused by two bullets from Oswald: the reaction interval was less than the 2.3 seconds that it took to reload. This was one of the commission's most crucial findings: that a single shot caused the non-fatal wounds of Kennedy and Connally, known as the "single-bullet theory". In May 1964, staffer Arlen Specter replicated the single bullet's trajectory via a reenactment in Dealey Plaza: the bullet's path was exactly consistent with Kennedy's and Connally's wounds.

Out of the eight commission members, three—Representative Hale Boggs and senators John Cooper and Richard Russell—found the theory "improbable"; their qualms were not mentioned in the final report. Conspiracy theorists labeled this theory the "magic bullet theory", partly due to the bullet's intact and purportedly pristine state. However, the HSCA's Michael Baden noted that the bullet, despite its lack of fragmentation, was fundamentally deformed. In 2023, Secret Service agent Paul E. Landis—who had stood on the running board of Kennedy's car—told The New York Times that he retrieved the "magic bullet" from immediately behind Kennedy's seat upon arrival at Parkland, and that he placed it on Kennedy's stretcher. Landis believes that the bullet dislodged from a shallow wound in Kennedy's back.

As well as the Warren Report's 27 published volumes, the commission created hundreds of thousands of pages of investigative reports and documents. Relman Morin stated that "Never in history was a crime probed as intensely"; Bugliosi concluded that the commission's basic findings have "held up remarkably well". According to Gerald Posner, the Warren report is "universally derided" by the American public. Walter Cronkite noted that "Although the Warren Commission had full power to conduct its own independent investigation, it permitted the FBI and the CIA to investigate themselves—and so cast a permanent shadow on the answers." According to a 2014 report by CIA Chief Historian David Robarge, then-CIA director John A. McCone was involved in a "benign cover-up" by withholding information from the commission.

=== Trial of Clay Shaw ===
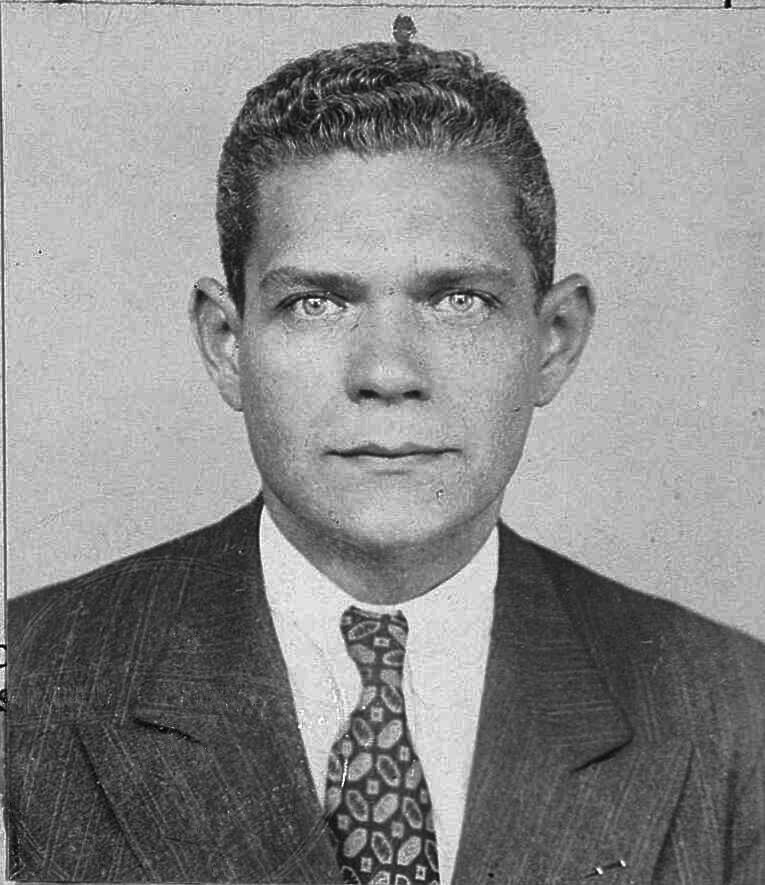
Clay Shaw (pictured in 1951) was acquitted by the New Orleans jury after less than an hour of deliberation.

On March 22, 1967, New Orleans district attorney Jim Garrison arrested and charged New Orleans businessman Clay Shaw with conspiring to assassinate President Kennedy, with the help of Oswald, David Ferrie, and others. A respected businessman who had helped renovate and preserve the French Quarter, Shaw was described as "the unlikeliest villain since Oscar Wilde". Both Shaw and the neurotic, avidly anti-Castro Ferrie were members of New Orleans' gay community. Ferrie died, possibly by suicide, four days after news of the investigation broke. On The Tonight Show Starring Johnny Carson in 1968, Garrison first publicly alleged that Shaw and Ferrie had been part of a larger CIA scheme to kill Kennedy and frame Oswald. In the 34-day trial conducted in 1969, Garrison played the Zapruder film and argued that the backward motion of Kennedy's head after the fatal shot was indicative of a shooter in front of the grassy knoll.

After a brief deliberation, the jury found Shaw not guilty. Mark Lane interviewed the jurors after the trial and stated that some believed that Shaw likely was involved in a conspiracy but that there was insufficient evidence to convict. Lane's claims have been disputed by playwright James Kirkwood—a personal friend of Clay Shaw—who said that he met several jurors who denied ever speaking to Lane. Kirkwood also questioned Lane's claim that the jury believed that there was a conspiracy: Jury foreman Sidney Hebert told Kirkwood, "I didn't think too much of the Warren Report either until the trial. Now I think a lot more of it than I did before."

According to academic E. Jerald Ogg, the Shaw trial is widely regarded as a "travesty of justice"; Kirkwood likened the trial to a Spanish Inquisition hearing. Other observers have characterized the proceedings as relying on homophobia. It remains the only trial to be brought for the Kennedy assassination. In 1979, former CIA director Richard Helms testified that Shaw had been a part-time contact of the Domestic Contact Service of the CIA, through which Shaw volunteered information from his travels abroad, mostly to Latin America. However, according to Max Holland, some 150,000 Americans were contacts. In 1993, the PBS program Frontline obtained a group photograph that featured Ferrie and Oswald together at a 1955 cookout for the Civil Air Patrol. Ferrie had denied ever knowing Oswald.

=== Ramsey Clark Panel ===
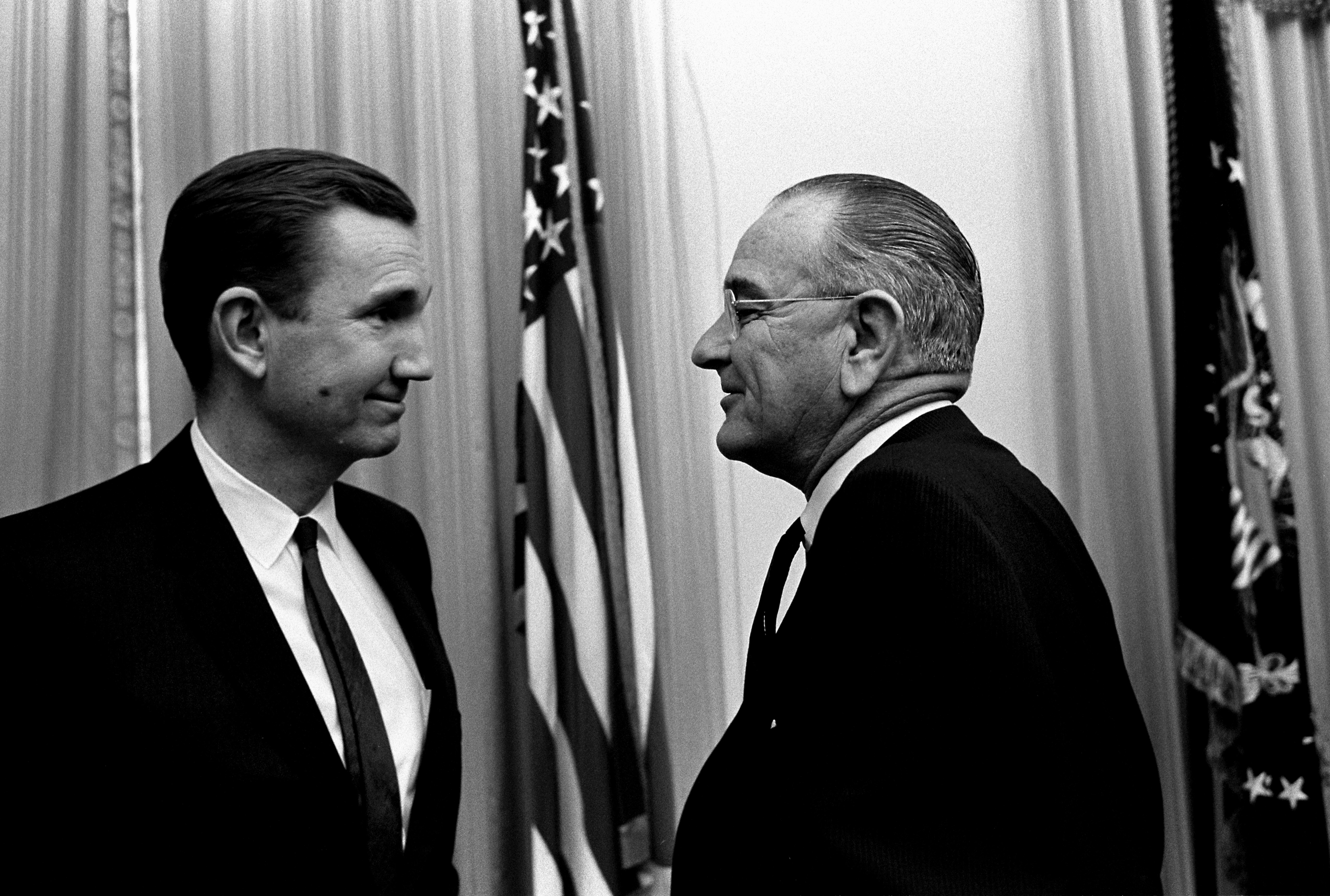
The panel organized by Attorney General Ramsey Clark (pictured with President Lyndon B. Johnson in 1968) found that two bullets struck Kennedy from behind.

Excluding Chief Justice Warren, the members of the Warren Commission did not view the photographs or X-rays taken during Kennedy's autopsy. According to Warren, this was to avoid having to publicly release the explicit material to "sensation mongers". Due to persistent speculation, in February 1968, Attorney General Ramsey Clark convened a panel of four medical experts to examine the photographs and X-rays from the Kennedy autopsy. Their findings concurred with the Warren Commission: Kennedy was struck by two bullets, both from behind.

=== Rockefeller Commission ===
In 1975, President Gerald Ford—who had been a member of the Warren Commission a decade prior—established the United States President's Commission on CIA Activities within the United States, better known as the Rockefeller Commission after its chairman, Vice President Nelson Rockefeller. The commission received a mandate to determine if any domestic activities by the CIA were unlawful and to make appropriate recommendations; accordingly, it also re-examined the Kennedy assassination.

The Rockefeller Commission first proposed that the backward motion of Kennedy following the fatal shot—which conspiracy theorists claim is indicative of a shot from the grassy knoll—was due to a "seizure-like neuromuscular reaction".

After five months of investigation, the Rockefeller Commission submitted its report to President Ford. The report reviewed the medical evidence and agreed that Kennedy had been killed by two shots from behind. Refuting Garrison's claims that the backward motion of Kennedy's head seen on the Zapruder film was indicative of a grassy knoll shooter, the commission found that "such a motion would be caused by a violent straightening and stiffening of the entire body as a result of a seizure-like neuromuscular reaction to major damage inflicted to nerve centers in the brain". The later HSCA suggested that the "propulsive effect resulting from brain matter" ejected from the exit wound may have been responsible. Pathologist Vincent Di Maio testified before the HSCA that the notion of a "transfer of momentum" from a grassy knoll bullet was unfounded and something from "Arnold Schwarzenegger pictures".

The Rockefeller Commission also sought to determine whether CIA operatives—particularly E. Howard Hunt and Frank Sturgis—were present in Dealey Plaza during the assassination, and whether they were among the "three tramps" pictured shortly after the assassination. The commission found no evidence for these claims. It also inquired into purported connections between the CIA and Oswald and Ruby, for which it found no evidence and concluded was "farfetched speculation". They concluded that there was "no credible evidence of CIA involvement".

=== Church Committee ===
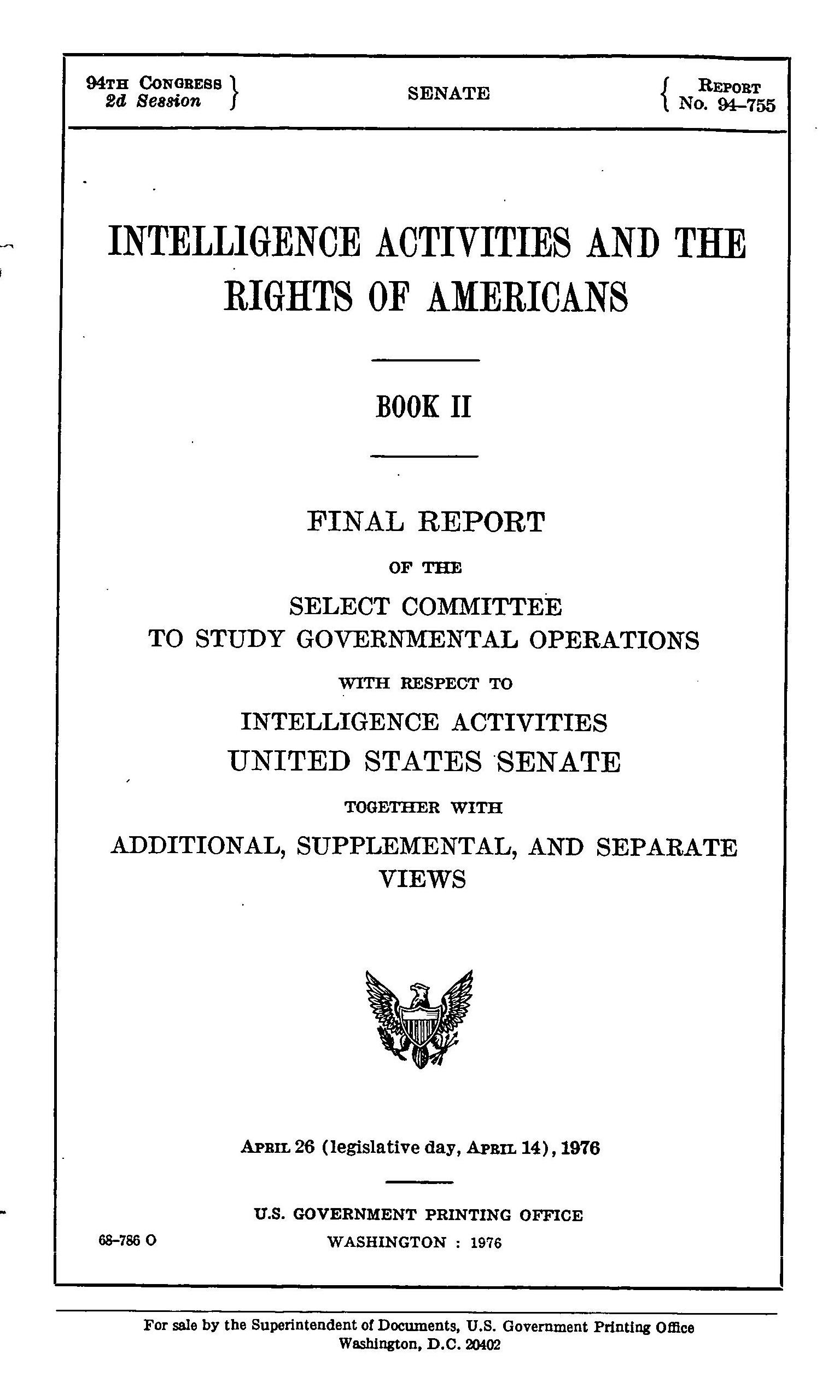
Church Committee report (Book II)

In 1975, following the Watergate scandal and the revelation of CIA misconduct by Seymour Hersh (the CIA's so-called "Family Jewels"), the U.S. Senate launched the United States Senate Select Committee to Study Governmental Operations with Respect to Intelligence Activities—better known as the Church Committee after its chairman, Senator Frank Church. The committee was to investigate all improper and unlawful actions by the CIA and FBI, both foreign and domestic. Due to persisting theories, the Church Committee organized a subcommittee (staffed by senators Richard Schweiker and Gary Hart) to examine CIA and FBI conduct about the assassination.

In its final report, the Church Committee concluded that there was no evidence of a CIA- or FBI-led conspiracy. They found that the original investigation into the assassination was "deficient" and criticized the FBI and CIA for withholding information from the Warren Commission. In particular, it noted that knowledge of the CIA's many failed attempts to assassinate Castro may have significantly affected the course of the investigation. Moreover, the Church Committee revealed that the CIA had conspired with the Mafia in these plots against Castro. These revelations led to further public scrutiny of the assassination.

=== United States House Select Committee on Assassinations ===
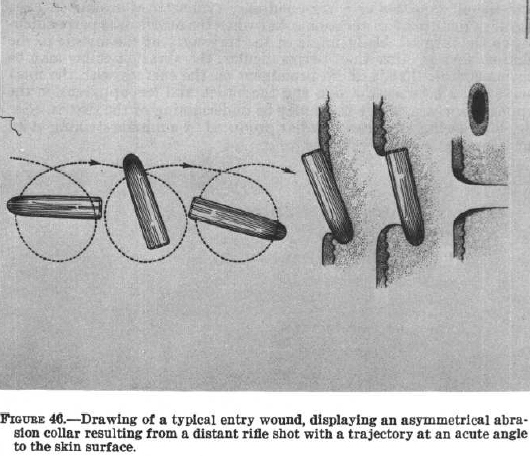
The HSCA concurred with the Warren Commission's single-bullet theory. (The figure illustrates how the oblong wound in Connally's back was indicative of a bullet that had been tumbling after striking an intervening object.)

Of the nine-member medical panel, only Dr. Cyril Wecht (testimony above) rejected the theory.

As a result of increasing public and congressional skepticism of the Warren Commission's findings and the transparency of government agencies, in 1976 the House Select Committee on Assassinations was created to investigate the assassinations of Kennedy and of Martin Luther King, Jr.

The HSCA conducted its inquiry until 1978 and issued its final report the following year, concluding that Kennedy was likely assassinated as a result of a conspiracy. They concluded that there was a "high probability" that a fourth shot was fired from the grassy knoll, but they stated that this shot missed Kennedy. Concerning the conclusions of "probable conspiracy", four of the twelve committee members wrote dissenting opinions.

The HSCA also concluded that previous investigations into Oswald's responsibility were "thorough and reliable" but did not adequately investigate the possibility of a conspiracy, and that federal agencies performed with "varying degrees of competency". Specifically, the FBI and CIA were found to be deficient in sharing information with other agencies and the Warren Commission. Instead of furnishing all relevant information, the FBI and CIA only responded to specific requests and were still occasionally inadequate. Furthermore, the Secret Service did not properly analyze the information it possessed before the assassination and was inadequately prepared to protect Kennedy.

The chief reason for the conclusion of "probable conspiracy" was, according to the report's dissent, the subsequently discredited acoustic analysis of a police channel Dictabelt recording. In accordance with the recommendations of the HSCA, the Dictabelt recording and acoustic evidence of a second assassin were subsequently reexamined. In light of investigative reports from the FBI's Technical Services Division and a specially appointed National Academy of Sciences Committee determining that "reliable acoustic data do not support a conclusion that there was a second gunman", the Justice Department concluded "that no persuasive evidence can be identified to support the theory of a conspiracy" in the Kennedy assassination.

=== JFK Act and Assassination Records Review Board ===
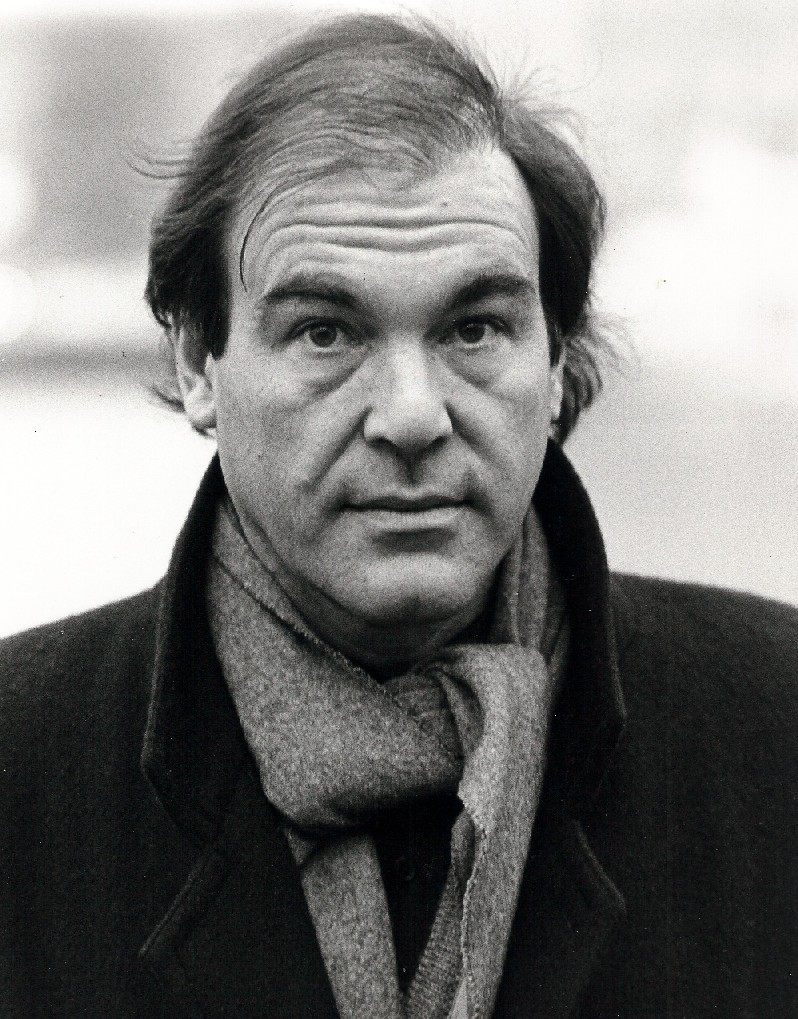
Oliver Stone's 1991 film JFK spurred the "JFK Act".

In 1991, Oliver Stone's film JFK renewed interest in the assassination and particularly in the still-classified files relating to the killing. In response, Congress passed the JFK Records Act, which called for the National Archives to collect and release all assassination-related documents within 25 years. The act also mandated the creation of an independent office, the Assassination Records Review Board, to review the submitted records for completeness and continued secrecy. From 1994 until 1998, the Assassination Records Review Board gathered and unsealed about 60,000 documents comprising over 4 million pages.

A 1998 staff report for the Assassinations Records Review Board contended that brain photographs in the Kennedy records may not be of Kennedy's brain, reportedly showing much less damage than Kennedy sustained. Dr. Boswell refuted these allegations. The board also found that, conflicting with the photographic images showing no such defect, several witnesses (at both Parkland hospital and the autopsy) remembered a large wound in the back of Kennedy's head. The board, and board member Jeremy Gunn, stressed the problems with witness testimony, urging people to weigh all of the evidence, with due concern for human error, rather than take single statements as "proof" for one theory or another.

President Donald Trump signing declassification orders in the Oval Office, 2025

All remaining assassination-related records were scheduled to be released by October 2017, except documents certified for continued postponement by succeeding presidents due to "identifiable harm ... to the military, defense, intelligence operations, law enforcement, or conduct of foreign relations ... of such gravity that it outweighs the public interest in disclosure." President Donald Trump said in October 2017 that he would not block the release of documents, but in April 2018—the deadline he set to release all JFK records—Trump blocked the release of some records until October 2021.

President Joe Biden, citing the COVID-19 pandemic, delayed the release further, before releasing 13,173 unredacted documents in 2022. A second group of files were unsealed in June 2023, at which point 99 percent of documents had been made public. Three days after entering office for the second time in January 2025, Trump signed an executive order to declassify the remaining documents pertaining to the assassination within 15 days. More than 60,000 documents were released two months later on March 18.

== Conspiracy theories ==
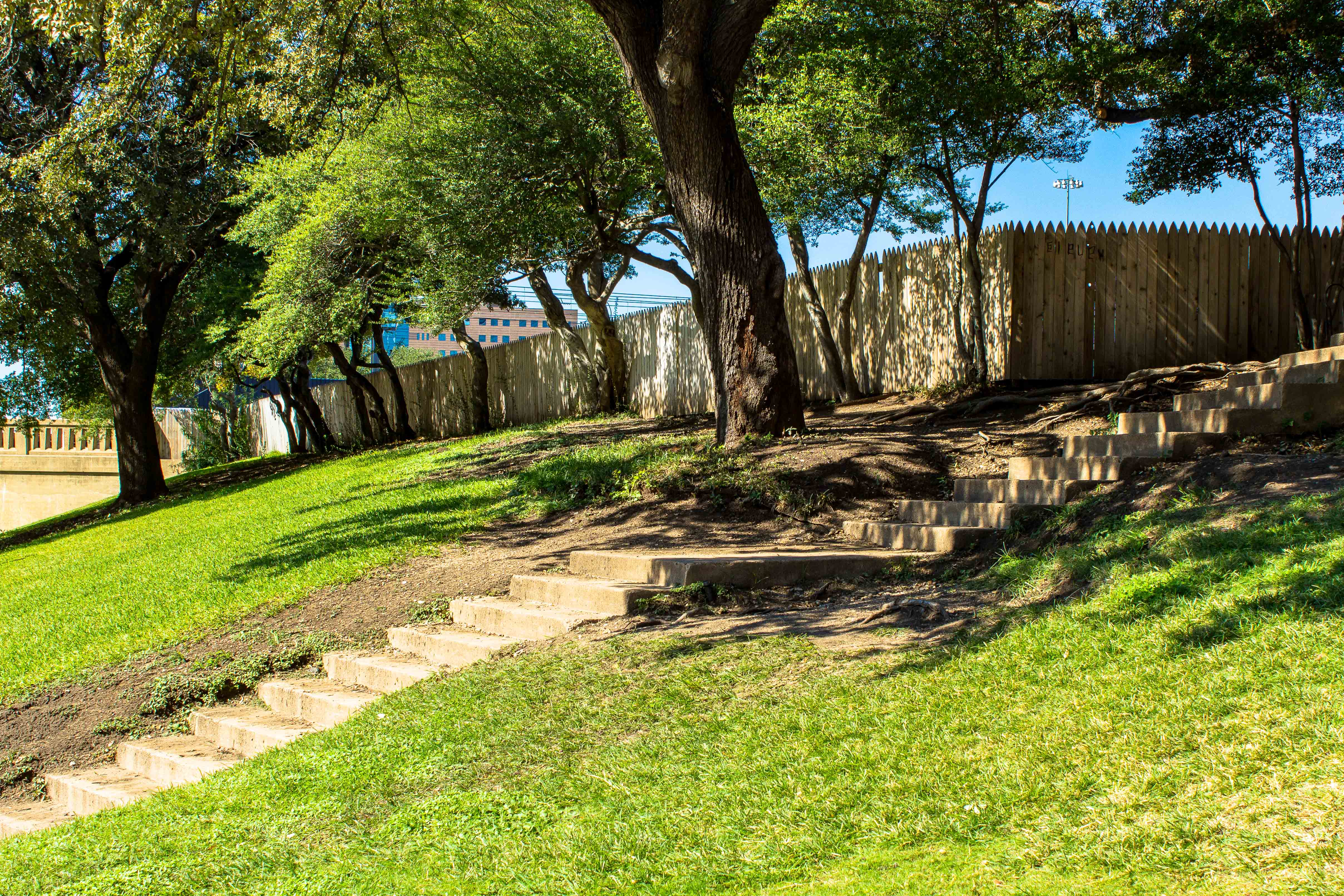
The wooden fence on the grassy knoll, where many theories claim that a second gunman stood

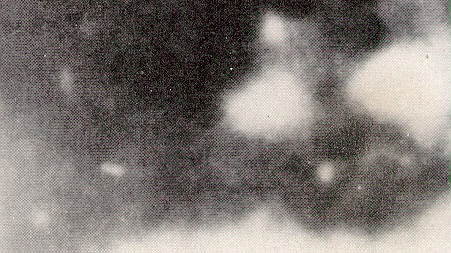
The "Badge Man" purportedly seen firing a weapon from the grassy knoll in this expansion of the Mary Moorman photograph

The Kennedy assassination has been described as "the mother of all conspiracies". For decades, polls have consistently found that a majority of Americans believe there was a conspiracy; some 1,000 to 2,000 books—mostly pro-conspiracy—have been written about the killing. Across different theories, Oswald's role varies from co-conspirator to entirely innocent. Common culprits include the FBI, the CIA, the U.S. military, the Mafia, the military-industrial complex, Vice President Johnson, Castro, the KGB, or some combination thereof. Bugliosi estimated that a total of 42 groups, 82 assassins, and 214 people had been accused in various assassination theories.

Conspiracy theorists often argue that there were multiple shooters—a "triangulation of crossfire"—and that the fatal shot was fired from the grassy knoll and struck Kennedy in the front of the head. Individuals present in Dealey Plaza have been the subject of much speculation, including the three tramps, the umbrella man, and the purported Badge Man. Conspiracy theorists argue that the autopsy and official investigations were flawed or, at worst, complicit, and that witnesses to the Kennedy assassination, like Gary Underhill, met mysterious and suspicious deaths.

Conspiracy theories have been espoused by notable figures, such as L. Fletcher Prouty, Chief of Special Operations for the Joint Chiefs of Staff under Kennedy, who believed that elements of the U.S. military and intelligence communities had conspired to assassinate the president. Governor Connally also rejected the single-bullet theory, and President Johnson reportedly expressed doubt regarding the Warren Commission's conclusions before his death. According to Robert F. Kennedy Jr., his father believed that the Warren Report was a "shoddy piece of craftsmanship" and that John F. Kennedy had been killed by a conspiracy, possibly involving Cuban exiles and the CIA. Communist rulers like Castro and Soviet First Secretary Nikita Khrushchev believed that Kennedy had been killed by right-wing Americans. Former CIA director R. James Woolsey has argued that Oswald killed Kennedy as part of a Soviet conspiracy.

== Legacy ==
=== Political impact and memorialization ===
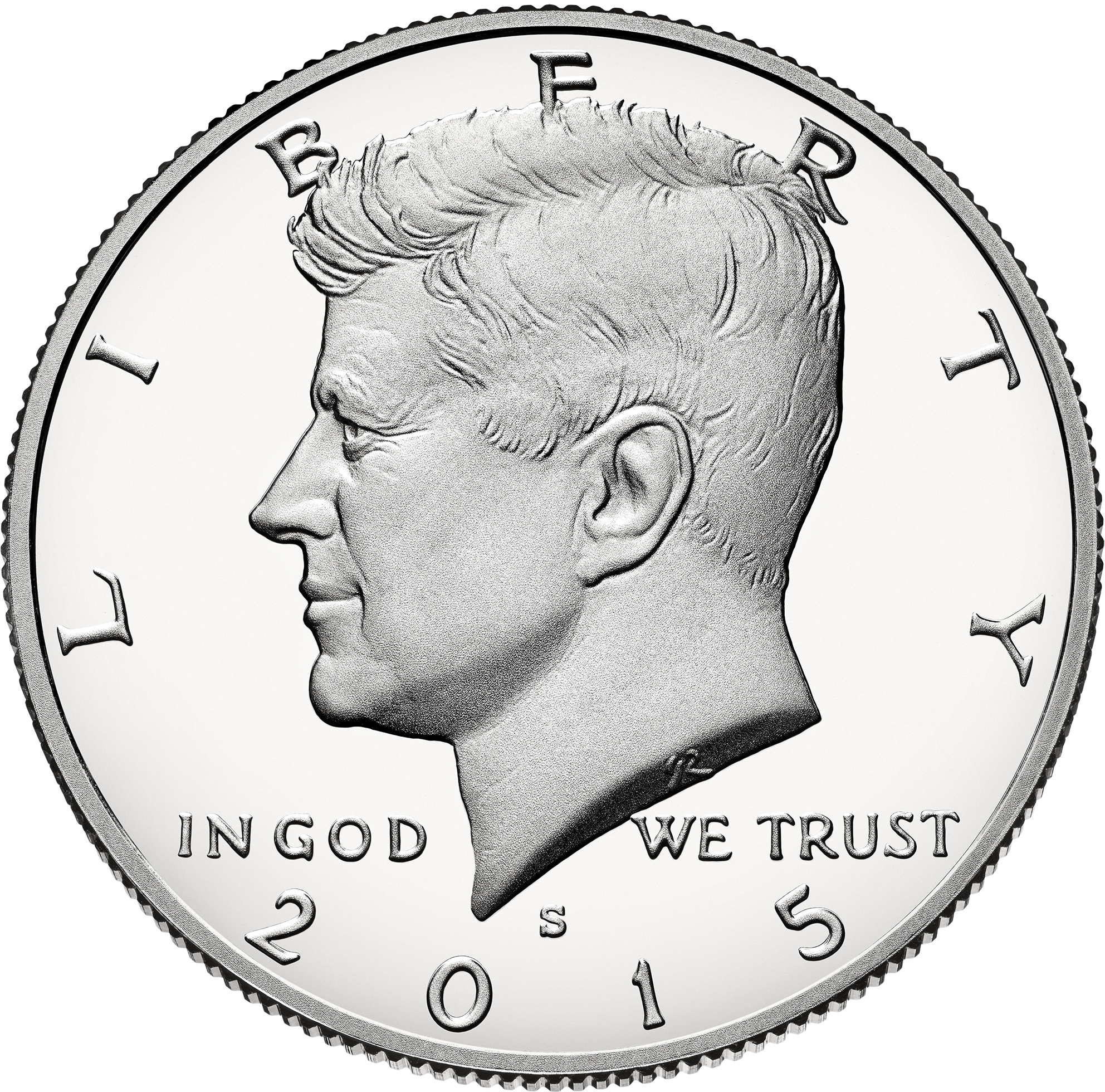
Congress authorized the minting of a new 50-cent piece, the Kennedy half-dollar, in December 1963.

On November 27—five days after the assassination—President Johnson delivered his "Let Us Continue" speech to Congress. Effectively an inaugural address, Johnson called for the realization of Kennedy's policies, particularly on civil rights; this effort soon materialized as the Civil Rights Act of 1964. Confusion surrounding Johnson's succession led to the Twenty-fifth Amendment to the U.S. Constitution, which was adopted in 1967 and affirmed that the vice president became president upon the president's death.

On November 29, President Johnson issued Executive Order 11129, renaming Florida's Cape Canaveral—a name borne since at least 1530—to Cape Kennedy. (Note: In 1973, due to Floridians' discontent with the change, Florida Governor Reubin Askew mandated that Cape Kennedy be referred to as Cape Canaveral on all state documents and maps. The U.S. Board of Geographic Names accepted the name change later that year.) NASA's Launch Operations Center, located on the cape, was also renamed as the Kennedy Space Center. The federal government honored Kennedy in other ways, such as replacing the Benjamin Franklin half-dollar with the Kennedy half-dollar, and renaming Washington, D.C.'s long-planned National Culture Center as the John F. Kennedy Center for the Performing Arts. New York City's airport was also renamed as the John F. Kennedy International Airport.

Kennedy's assassination also resulted in an overhaul of the Secret Service and its procedures. Open limousines were eliminated, staffing was significantly increased, and specialized teams like counter-sniper units were established. The agency's budget has also increased, from $5.5 million in 1963 (equivalent to $57,800,000 in 2025) to over $1.6 billion by the 50th anniversary in 2013.

=== Cultural impact and depictions ===
- They say they can't believe it; It's a sacrilegious shame.
- Now, who would want to hurt such a hero of the game?
- But you know I predicted it; I knew he had to fall.
- How did it happen? Hope his suffering was small.
- Tell me every detail, for I've got to know it all,
- And do you have a picture of the pain?

— Phil Ochs' song "Crucifixion" (1966)

John F. Kennedy's assassination was the first of four major assassinations during the 1960s, coming two years before the assassination of Malcolm X in 1965, and five years before the assassinations of Martin Luther King Jr. and Robert F. Kennedy in 1968. For the public, Kennedy's assassination mythologized him into a heroic figure. Although scholars typically regard Kennedy as a good but not great president, public opinion polls consistently find him the most popular post-WWII president.

The event left a lasting impression on many worldwide. As with the preceding attack on Pearl Harbor of December 7, 1941, and the subsequent September 11 attacks, asking "Where were you when you heard about President Kennedy's assassination?" would become a common topic of discussion. Journalist Dan Rather said the Kennedy assassination will be discussed "a hundred years from now, a thousand years from now, in somewhat the same way as people discuss the Iliad. Different people read Homer's description of the war and come to different conclusions, and so it shall be for Kennedy's death."

Along with Oliver Stone's JFK, the assassination has been portrayed in several films: the pro-conspiracy, Dalton Trumbo–written Executive Action (1973) was the first feature film to depict the assassination. Besides explicit portrayals, some critics have argued that the Zapruder film—which itself has been featured in many films and television episodes—advanced cinéma vérité or inspired more graphic depictions of violence in American cinema. Many works of literature have also explored the killing, such as Don DeLillo's 1988 novel Libra, in which Oswald is a CIA agent, James Ellroy's 1995 work American Tabloid, and Stephen King's 2011 time travel novel 11/22/63. The assassination has also been featured in several musical compositions, such as Igor Stravinsky's 1964 piece Elegy for J.F.K. and Phil Ochs' 1966 song "Crucifixion", which reportedly brought Robert Kennedy to tears. Other songs include "Abraham, Martin and John" (1968) and Bob Dylan's "Murder Most Foul" (2020).

=== Artifacts, museums, and locations ===
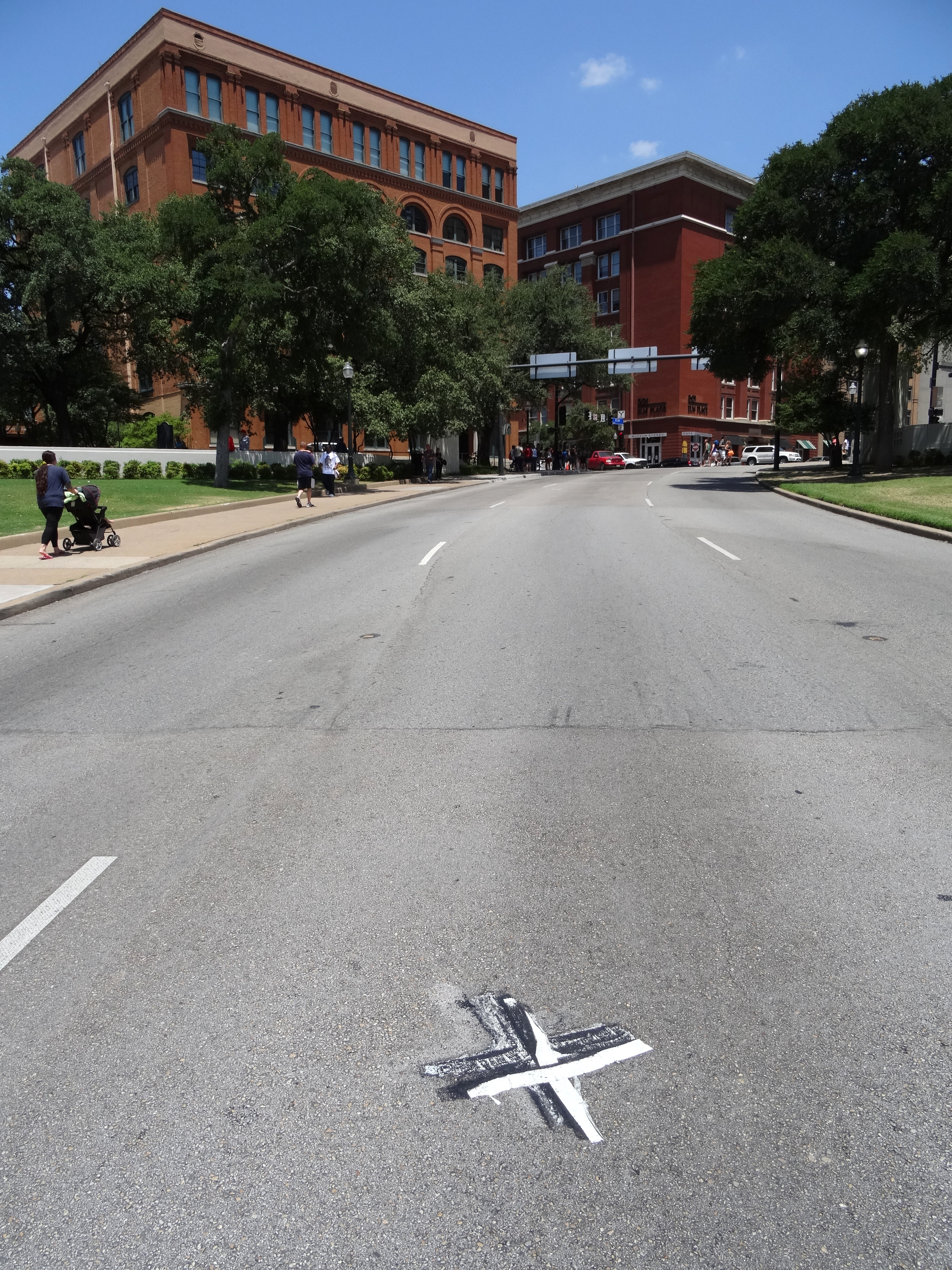
An "X" in the Dealey Plaza roadway marks where the fatal bullet struck Kennedy.

In 1993, the National Park Service designated Dealey Plaza, the surrounding buildings, the overpass, and a portion of the adjacent railyard as a National Historic Landmark District. The depository and its Sixth Floor Museum, operated by the city of Dallas, draws over 325,000 visitors annually.

The Boeing 707 that served as Air Force One at the time of the assassination is on display at the National Museum of the United States Air Force; Kennedy's limousine is at the Henry Ford Museum. The Lincoln Catafalque, on which Kennedy's coffin rested in the Capitol, is exhibited at the Capitol Visitor Center. Jacqueline Kennedy's pink suit, autopsy X-rays, and President Kennedy's blood-stained clothing are in the National Archives, with access controlled by the Kennedy family. Other items in the Archives include Parkland Hospital trauma room equipment; Oswald's rifle, diary, and revolver; bullet fragments; and the limousine's windshield. The Texas State Archives preserve Connally's bullet-punctured clothes; the gun Ruby used to kill Oswald came into the possession of Ruby's brother Earl, and was sold in 1991 for $220,000 (equivalent to $520,000 in 2025).

At the direction of Robert F. Kennedy, some items were destroyed. The casket in which Kennedy's body was transported from Dallas to Washington was dropped into the sea, because "its public display would be extremely offensive and contrary to public policy".

== Notes and references ==
=== Works cited ===
==== Books ====
- Boyd, John W. (2015). Parkland. Arcadia Publishing. ISBN 9781467134002.
- United Press International; American Heritage (1964). Four Days: The Historical Record of the Death of President Kennedy. American Heritage Pub. Co. OCLC 923323127.
- Brinkley, David (2003). Brinkley's Beat: People, Places, and Events That Shaped My Time. Knopf. ISBN 9780375406447.
- Broderick, James F.; Miller, Darren W. (2008). Web of Conspiracy: A Guide to Conspiracy Theory Sites on the Internet. Information Today, Inc. ISBN 9780910965811.
- Bugliosi, Vincent (2008). Four Days in November: The Assassination of President John F. Kennedy. W.W. Norton & Co. ISBN 9780393332155.
- ——— (2007). Reclaiming History. W.W. Norton & Co. ISBN 9780393045253.
- Cilento, Fabrizio (2018). The Ontology of Replay: The Zapruder Video and American Conspiracy Films. Palgrave Macmillan. ISBN 9783030064891.
- Daniel, Douglass K. (2007). Harry Reasoner: A Life in the News. University of Texas Press. ISBN 9780292714779.
- Fischer, Heinz-D; Fischer, Erika J. (2003). The Pulitzer Prize Archive: A History and Anthology of Award-Winning Materials in Journalism, Letters and Arts. Vol. 17 Complete Historical Handbook of the Pulitzer Prize System 1917–2000. De Gruyter. ISBN 9783110939125.
- Hinckle, Warren; Turner, William W. (1981). The Fish is Red: The Story of the Secret War Against Castro. Harper & Row. ISBN 9780060380038.
- Jones, Howard (2008). The Bay of Pigs. Oxford University Press. ISBN 9780195173833.
- Kirkwood Jr., James (1992). American Grotesque: An Account of the Clay Shaw-Jim Garrison-Kennedy Assassination Trial in New Orleans. Harper Perennial. ISBN 9780060975234.
- Mudd, Roger (2008). The place to be: Washington, CBS, and the glory days of television news. New York: PublicAffairs. ISBN 978-1-58648-576-4.
- The New York Times (2003). Semple, Robert B. Jr. (ed.). Four days in November: The Original Coverage of the John F. Kennedy Assassination. St. Martin's Press. OCLC 1149162285.
- Newfield, Jack (2002). Somebody's Gotta Tell It: A Journalist's Life on the Lines. St. Martin's Press. ISBN 0312269005.
- NBC News (1966). There Was a President. Random House. ASIN B000GOFC9O.
- Pett, Saul; Moody, Sidney C.; Henshaw, Tom (1963). The Torch Is Passed: The Associated Press Story of the Death of a President. Associated Press. OCLC 13554948.
- Posner, Gerald (1993). Case Closed. Random House. ISBN 9780679418252.
- Shahidullah, Shahid M. (2015). Crime Policy in America: Laws, Institutions, and Programs. Rowman & Littlefield. ISBN 9780761866589.
- Sabato, Larry (2013). The Kennedy Half-Century: The Presidency, Assassination, and Lasting Legacy of John F. Kennedy. Bloomsbury USA. ISBN 9781620402801.
- Summers, Anthony (2013). Not in Your Lifetime. Open Road. ISBN 9781480435483.
- Trask, Richard B. (1994). Pictures of the Pain: Photography and the Assassination of President Kennedy. Yeoman Press. ISBN 9780963859501.
- White, Theodore H. (1965). The Making of the President, 1964. Atheneum Publishers. ASIN B003SAGZMQ.
- Wrone, David R. (2003). The Zapruder Film: Reframing JFK's Assassination. University Press of Kansas. ISBN 9780700612918.

==== Government and institutional documents and reports ====
- Hoover, J. Edgar (December 1, 1963). Reaction of Soviet and Communist Party Officials to JFK Assassination (PDF) (Report). National Archives.
- Warren, Earl (1964). Report of the President's Commission on the Assassination of President Kennedy. United States Government Printing Office. ASIN B0065RJ63E.
- Clark, Ramsey (1968). 1968 Panel Review of Photographs, X-Ray Films, Documents and Other Evidence Pertaining to the Fatal Wounding of President John F. Kennedy on November 22, 1963, in Dallas, Texas (Report). United States Government Printing Office.
- Stokes, Louis (1979). Report of the Select Committee on Assassinations of the U.S. House of Representatives (Report). United States Government Printing Office. Archived from the original on April 3, 2020.
- HSCA Appendix to Hearings (Report). Archived from the original on July 1, 2022 – via History Matters Archive.
- Assassination Records Review Board (September 30, 1998). "Chapter 1: The Problem of Secrecy and the JFK Act" (PDF). Final Report of the Assassination Records Review Board. United States Government Printing Office. p. 6. Archived (PDF) from the original on May 11, 2021.
- Report of the Committee on Ballistic Acoustics. National Research Council. 1982. doi:10.17226/10264. ISBN 9780309253727. Archived from the original on December 6, 2013.
- Assassination Records Review Board (September 30, 1998). Final Report of the Assassination Records Review Board (PDF) (Report). United States Government Printing Office. Archived (PDF) from the original on May 11, 2021.

==== Warren Commission documents, exhibits, and testimonies ====
- Testimony of Gov. John Bowden Connally, Jr. Warren Commission Hearings (Report). Vol. IV. pp. 129–146. Archived from the original on March 15, 2013 – via Assassination Archives and Research Center.
- Testimony of Mrs. John Bowden Connally, Jr. Warren Commission Hearings (Report). Vol. IV. pp. 146–149. Archived from the original on March 15, 2013 – via Assassination Archives and Research Center.
- Testimony of Mrs. John F. Kennedy. Warren Commission Hearings (Report). Vol. V. June 5, 1964. pp. 178–181. Archived from the original on October 23, 2013 – via Assassination Archives and Research Center.
- Testimony of Dr. Robert Roeder Shaw. Warren Commission Hearings (Report). Vol. IV. pp. 101–117. Archived from the original on July 20, 2013 – via Assassination Archives and Research Center.
- Notes of interview of Lee Harvey Oswald — Certified military pay records for Lee Harvey Oswald for the period October 24, 1956, to September 11, 1959. Warren Commission Hearings (Report). Vol. 22. p. 705. Archived from the original on October 19, 2007 – via Assassination Archives and Research Center.
- Warren Commission Hearings, Folsom Exhibit No. 1 (cont'd) (Report). Vol. XIX Folsom. p. 734. Archived from the original on January 11, 2012.
- Testimony of James Thomas Tague. Warren Commission Hearings (Report). Vol. VII. July 23, 1964. pp. 552–558. Archived from the original on July 20, 2013 – via Assassination Archives and Research Center.
- Testimony of Clinton J. Hill, Special Agent, Secret Service. Warren Commission Hearings (Report). Vol. II. pp. 132–144. Archived from the original on October 15, 2012 – via Assassination Archives and Research Center.
- Testimony of Bobby W. Hargis. Warren Commission Hearings (Report). Vol. VI. April 8, 1964. pp. 293–296. Archived from the original on September 25, 2012 – via Assassination Archives and Research Center.
- Testimony of Clyde A. Haygood. Warren Commission Hearings (Report). Vol. VI. April 9, 1964. pp. 296–302. Archived from the original on July 20, 2013 – via Assassination Archives and Research Center.
- Commission Exhibit 2564 – Cuban visa application of Lee Harvey Oswald, September 27, 1963. Warren Commission Hearings (Report). Vol. 25. p. 418. Archived from the original on January 11, 2012 – via Assassination Archives and Research Center.
- Testimony of Jack Ruby. Warren Commission Hearings (Report). Vol. V. pp. 198–200. Archived from the original on February 25, 2021 – via Assassination Archives and Research Center.
- Testimony of Kenneth P. O'Donnell. Warren Commission Hearings (Report). Vol. VII. pp. 440–457. Archived from the original on January 25, 2012 – via Assassination Archives and Research Center.
- Testimony of Howard Brennan. Warren Commission Hearings (Report). Vol. III. pp. 144–145. Archived from the original on July 26, 2018 – via Assassination Archives and Research Center.
- Testimony of Lee E. Bowers, Jr. Warren Commission Hearings (Report). Archived from the original on June 26, 2022.
- Report of Capt. J. W. Fritz, Dallas Police Department. Warren Commission Hearings (Report). pp. 599–611. Archived from the original on October 8, 2012 – via Assassination Archives and Research Center.
- Reports of Agents of the Federal Bureau of Investigation. Warren Commission Hearings (Report). pp. 612–625. Archived from the original on September 19, 2012 – via Assassination Archives and Research Center.
- "National Archives Releases JFK Assassination Records". National Archives. October 26, 2017. Archived from the original on April 22, 2020.
- "Memorandum for the Heads of Executive Departments and Agencies on the Temporary Certification Regarding Disclosure of Information in Certain Records Related to the Assassination of President John F. Kennedy". The White House. October 23, 2021. Archived from the original on October 28, 2021.

==== Journal articles ====
- Ball, Moya Ann (Winter 1994). "The Phantom of the Oval Office: The John F. Kennedy Assassination's Symbolic Impact on Lyndon B. Johnson, His Key Advisers, and the Vietnam Decision-Making Process". Presidential Studies Quarterly. 24 (1): 105–119. JSTOR 27551197.
- Evica, George Michael (1992). "Deconstructing the DA: The Garrison Image in JFK". Cinéaste. 19 (1): 17–19. JSTOR 41688060.
- Fantova, Johanna (Autumn 1964). Cape Canaveral to Cape Kennedy. The Princeton University Library Chronicle (Report). Vol. 26. Princeton University. pp. 57–62. JSTOR 26402928.
- Holland, Max (2001). "The Lie That Linked CIA to the Kennedy Assassination". Studies in Intelligence. 45 (5).
- Huber, Patrick (Winter 2007). "Father Oscar Huber, the Kennedy Assassination, and the News Leak Controversy: A Research Note". Southwestern Historical Quarterly. 110 (3): 380–393. doi:10.1353/swh.2007.0016. ISSN 0038-478X. JSTOR 30240454. S2CID 143939686.
- Kurtz, Michael L. (November 1982). "The Assassination of John F. Kennedy: A Historical Perspective". The Historian. 45 (1): 1–19. doi:10.1111/j.1540-6563.1982.tb01568.x. JSTOR 24445228.
- Ogg, E. Jerald (Spring 2004). "Life and the Prosecution of Clay Shaw: A More Curious Silence". Louisiana History: The Journal of the Louisiana Historical Association. 45 (2): 133–149. JSTOR 4233998.
- Payne, Anthony (Summer 1965). "Stravinsky's 'Abraham and Isaac' and 'Elegy for J. F. K.'". Tempo. 73 (73): 12–15. doi:10.1017/S0040298200033520. JSTOR 942857. S2CID 145010719.
- Reitzes, David (Summer 2013). "JFK conspiracy theories at 50: how the skeptics got it wrong and why it matters". Skeptic. 18 (3).
- Stafford, Ned (July 13, 2012). "Earl Rose: Pathologist prevented from performing autopsy on US President John F Kennedy" (PDF). BMJ. 345. doi:10.1136/bmj.e4768. S2CID 220100505. Archived from the original (PDF) on November 4, 2014.
- Thomas, Glen (Spring 1997). "History, Biography, and Narrative in Don DeLillo's Libra". Twentieth Century Literature. 43 (1): 107–124. doi:10.2307/441866. JSTOR 441866.
- Tunheim, John R. (Winter 2000). "Assassination Records Review Board: Unlocking the Government's Secret Files on the Murder of a President". The Public Lawyer. 8 (1).
- Witherspoon, Patricia D. (Summer 1987). ""Let Us Continue:" The Rhetorical Initiation of Lyndon Johnson's Presidency". Presidential Studies Quarterly. 17 (3): 531–539. JSTOR 27550444.

==== Magazines ====
- Bagdikian, Ben H. (December 14, 1963). Blair, Clay Jr. (ed.). "The Assassin". The Saturday Evening Post (44). The Curtis Publishing Company.
- Friedman, Rick (November 30, 1963). "Pictures of the Assassination Fall to Amateurs on Street". Editor & Publisher.
- Kirkwood Jr., James (December 1, 1968). "So here you are, Clay Shaw, twenty months and thousands of dollars after being charged with conspiracy in the worst crime of the century. What are you doing about it?". Esquire.

==== News publications and websites ====
- Baker, Peter (September 9, 2023). "J.F.K. Assassination Witness Breaks His Silence and Raises New Questions". The New York Times. Archived from the original on September 10, 2023.
- Baluch, Jerry T. (November 30, 1963). "Warren Heads Probe into Assassination". Pittsburgh Post-Gazette. Associated Press.
- Becket, Stefan (January 23, 2025). "Trump says he will release more JFK assassination files". CBS News.
- Bender, Bryan (November 25, 2013). "Troves of files on JFK assassination remain secret". The Boston Globe. Archived from the original on February 11, 2015.
- "Biographical sketch of Dr. George Gregory Burkley, Arlington National Cemetery". Arlington National Cemetery. Archived from the original on January 12, 2009.
- Bomboy, Scott (November 22, 2022). "How JFK's assassination led to a constitutional amendment". National Constitution Center. Archived from the original on March 1, 2023.
- Borger, Julian (October 27, 2022). "Cuban missile crisis, 60 years on: new papers reveal how close the world came to nuclear disaster". The Guardian. Archived from the original on May 1, 2023.
- Brinkley, Alan (September 19, 2013). "The Legacy of John F. Kennedy". The Atlantic. Archived from the original on August 29, 2016.
- Burkley, George Gregory (November 23, 1963). Certificate of Death. National Archives and Records Administration. front side, back side. NAVMED Form N – via The President John F. Kennedy Assassination Records Collection.
- "The Catafalque". History of Capitol Hill. Architect of the Capitol. Archived from the original on December 12, 2012.
- McCloy, John; Cronkite, Walter; Specter, Arlen (June 28, 1967). "A CBS News Inquiry: The Warren Report – Part 4". C-SPAN. Archived from the original on April 1, 2023.
- Chinni, Dante (October 29, 2017). "The One Thing All Americans Agree On: JFK Conspiracy". NBC.
- "Clarifying the Federal Record on the Zapruder Film and the Medical and Ballistics Evidence". Federation of American Scientists. Archived from the original on February 24, 2021.
- "The Cold War". John F. Kennedy Presidential Library and Museum. Archived from the original on May 11, 2023.
- D'Angelo, Bob (June 3, 2018). "Robert Kennedy assassination: Dion's 'Abraham, Martin and John' helped heal a nation in turmoil". The Atlanta Journal-Constitution.
- "Dealey Plaza Historic District". National Historic Landmarks Program. National Park Service. Archived from the original on November 13, 2012.
- Dettmar, Kevin (March 28, 2020). "What Bob Dylan Is Doing in "Murder Most Foul"". The New Yorker.
- "Documents State JFK's Dallas Coffin Disposed At Sea". JFK Lancer Independent News Exchange. Associated Press. June 1, 1999. Archived from the original on September 22, 2012.
- Dugan, Andrew; Newport, Frank (November 15, 2013). "Americans Rate JFK as Top Modern President". Gallup. Archived from the original on August 1, 2016.
- Fossum, Sam (June 30, 2023). "National Archives concludes review of JFK assassination documents with 99% made public". CNN.
- Gates, Anita (June 7, 1998). "The Private Side of a Political Story". The New York Times.
- Haslett, Cheyenne; Brennan, David (March 18, 2025). "Released JFK files reveal Social Security numbers of former staffers". ABC News.
- "George Jefferies Film". George Jefferies Collection. Sixth Floor Museum at Dealey Plaza. Archived from the original on August 11, 2019.
- Goldberg, Barbara (December 26, 1991). "Jack Ruby's Gun Sold For $220,000". Associated Press. Archived from the original on January 11, 2023.
- Goldstein, Patrick (February 19, 1995). "Welcome to Sleaze 101 : When James Ellroy starts explaining the Kennedy assassination, watch out". Los Angeles Times.
- "History of John F. Kennedy Space Center". National Aeronautics and Space Administration. September 20, 2016. Archived from the original on April 20, 2023.
- Hogan, Mike (March 27, 2020). "OK Boomer: How Bob Dylan's New JFK Song Helps Explain 2020". Vanity Fair.
- Holland, Max (November 20, 2014). "The Truth Behind JFK's Assassination". Newsweek. Archived from the original on February 5, 2016.
- Hornaday, Ann (December 22, 2021). "'JFK' at 30: Oliver Stone and the lasting impact of America's most dangerous movie". The Washington Post.
- "How the JFK Zapruder film 'revolutionised' Hollywood". France24. November 22, 2013.
- Inverne, James (June 11, 2004). "Think you know your film facts?". The Guardian. Archived from the original on December 3, 2013.
- "JFK International Marks Major Milestones in 2013 as 50th Anniversary of Airport Renaming Approaches". Port Authority of New York and New Jersey. December 17, 2013.
- "John F. Kennedy: A Featured Biography". United States Senate. Archived from the original on April 4, 2023.
- "John F. Kennedy". The White House. Archived from the original on May 5, 2023.
- Jones, Chris (September 16, 2013). "The Flight from Dallas". Esquire. Archived from the original on August 3, 2021.
- Jordison, Sam (May 7, 2019). "American Tabloid by James Ellroy is our Reading group book for May". The Guardian.
- Keen, Judy (November 20, 2009). "JFK 'relics' stir strong emotions". USA Today. Archived from the original on February 15, 2010.
- Lane, Mark (December 19, 1963) [November 22, 1963]. "Oswald Innocent? A Lawyer's Brief". National Guardian. Archived from the original on January 26, 2013.
- Lawson, Mark (November 2, 2011). "11.22.63 by Stephen King – review". The Guardian.
- Lawson, Mark (October 27, 2017). "The best books about the JFK assassination, from Norman Mailer to Don DeLillo". The Guardian.
- Lengel, Edward G. "Igor Stravinsky at the White House". The White House Historical Association.
- Lethbridge, Cliff. "History of Cape Canaveral". Spaceline. Archived from the original on November 26, 2022.
- "Letter from Assistant Attorney General William F. Weld to Peter W. Rodino Jr., undated" (PDF). Archived (PDF) from the original on November 9, 2021.
- MacAskill, Ewan (February 20, 2007). "New JFK film: 90 seconds to assassination". The Guardian.
- "Majority in U.S. Still Believe JFK Killed in a Conspiracy: Mafia, federal government top list of potential conspirators". Gallup, Inc. November 15, 2013. Archived from the original on August 1, 2016.
- Margolick, David (June 5, 2018). "How Robert Kennedy Inspired 'Abraham, Martin and John'". The New York Times. Archived from the original on May 20, 2023.
- Maslin, Janet (October 30, 2011). "Race Across Time to Stop Assassin and Fall in Love". The New York Times.
- Matza, Max (December 15, 2022). "Thousands of unedited government JFK assassination files released". BBC. Archived from the original on December 19, 2022.
- Matza, Max (March 18, 2025). "JFK experts scour newly unsealed assassination files". BBC News.
- McAdams, John (November 22, 1963). "The JFK Assassination Dallas Police Tapes: History in Real Time". The Kennedy Assassination. Marquette University. Archived from the original on November 15, 2011.
- Michaud, Jon (November 22, 2011). "Updike, J.F.K., and the Umbrella Man". The New Yorker. Archived from the original on June 5, 2023.
- Morris, Errol (November 10, 2011). "Stephen King Goes to the Rescue of JFK". The New York Times. Archived from the original on April 26, 2023.
- Munson, Kyle (April 29, 2012). "Munson: Iowan more than a footnote in JFK lore". The Des Moines Register. Indianapolis. pp. 1B–2B.
- "Music: Stravinsky Leads; Composer Conducts at Philharmonic Hall". The New York Times. December 7, 1964.
- Naylor, Brian (November 7, 2013). "How Kennedy's Assassination Changed The Secret Service". NPR. Archived from the original on April 17, 2023.
- Neuman, Scott (October 27, 2017). "Documents Offer Insight Into Soviet View Of JFK Assassination". NPR.
- "Newly released film of JFK before assassination". MSNBC. NBC News. Associated Press. February 19, 2007. Archived from the original on January 11, 2018.
- "Oswald Didn't Kill Kennedy". New York Magazine. November 25, 2013. Archived from the original on June 5, 2023.
- "Oswald's Ghost". American Experience. PBS. Archived from the original on February 24, 2017.
- Pappalardo, Joe (October 30, 2017). "'We Want Them to Shut Up': The Two Dallas Cops Who Earned Hoover's Ire After JFK Killing". Dallas Observer.
- Pasternack, Alex (November 22, 2011). "Murder and Zapruder: Who Should Own the Rawest, Most Valuable Home Movie?". Vice.
- Pasternack, Alex (November 23, 2012). "The Other Shooter: The Saddest and Most Expensive 26 Seconds of Amateur Film Ever Made". Vice. Archived from the original on November 30, 2012.
- Patterson, Thom (November 18, 2013). "One JFK conspiracy theory that could be true". CNN. Archived from the original on October 10, 2019.
- Paulson, Dave (September 11, 2020). "Story Behind the Song: 'Abraham, Martin and John'". The Tennessean.
- "Phil Burleson, 61, Jack Ruby's Lawyer". The New York Times. June 1, 1995. Archived from the original on September 15, 2017.
- Pontchartrain, Blake (June 17, 2019). "Blake Pontchartrain: Where was the French Hospital in New Orleans, and what's its story?". The Advocate. Archived from the original on September 28, 2019.
- "President John Fitzgerald Kennedy Gravesite". Arlington National Cemetery. Archived from the original on July 6, 2022.
- "President Lyndon B. Johnson takes Oath of Office, 22 November 1963". John F. Kennedy Presidential Library and Museum. Archived from the original on October 19, 2018.
- Petridis, Alexis (March 27, 2020). "Bob Dylan: Murder Most Foul review – a dark, dense ballad for the end times". The Guardian. Archived from the original on May 20, 2023.
- "November 22, 1963: Death of the President". John F. Kennedy Presidential Library and Museum.
- Saner, Emine (October 21, 2013). "The president's brain is missing and other mysteriously mislaid body parts". The Guardian. Archived from the original on January 20, 2023.
- "Timeline of the C.I.A.'s 'Family Jewels'". The New York Times. June 26, 2007.
- Russo, Guy (February 25, 2021). "Ex-CIA Chief Gives JFK Assassination Some QAnon-Style Spin". The Daily Beast.
- Scott, A.O. (November 15, 2013). "Footage of Death Plays On in Memory". The New York Times.
- Shenon, Philip (October 12, 2014). "Was RFK a JFK Conspiracy Theorist?". Politico. Archived from the original on March 15, 2023.
- Carlson, Michael (June 21, 2001). "L Fletcher Prouty". The Guardian. Archived from the original on July 12, 2020.
- "Q: Why is it called The Sixth Floor Museum at Dealey Plaza?". Frequently Asked Questions. Sixth Floor Museum at Dealey Plaza. Archived from the original on November 17, 2012.
- Roberts, Chalmers M. (September 28, 1964). "Warren Report Says Oswald Acted Alone; Raps FBI, Secret Service". The Washington Post. p. A1.
- Robertson, Nan C. (September 6, 1971). "At Last, the Performances Begin". The New York Times. Archived from the original on August 19, 2020.
- Shenon, Philip (October 6, 2014). "Yes, the CIA Director Was Part of the JFK Assassination Cover-Up". POLITICO.
- Specter, Shanin (November 8, 2015). "Shanin Specter on His 50 Years With the Single Bullet Theory". The Daily Beast.
- Stone, Oliver. "JFK conspiracy deniers are in denial". USA Today. Archived from the original on November 22, 2013.
- "Senate Select Committee to Study Governmental Operations with Respect to Intelligence Activities". US Senate.
- Spivak, Alvin (November 26, 1963). "Eternal flame burns at Kennedy gravesite". United Press International. "At the mass, the Most Reverend Philip Hannan, auxiliary bishop of Washington, read from the fallen president's inaugural address and from his favorite biblical passages. This was the closest approach to a eulogy in the funeral service."
- "Trump has no plan to block scheduled release of JFK records". Winston-Salem Journal. Associated Press. October 21, 2017. Archived from the original on October 22, 2017.
- Vollman, William T. (February 26, 1995). "En Route to the Grassy Knoll". The New York Times. Archived from the original on May 27, 2023.
- "Walter Cronkite On The Assassination Of John F. Kennedy". NPR. November 22, 2013. Archived from the original on June 28, 2022.
- "Who Was Lee Harvey Oswald". Frontline. PBS. Archived from the original on September 30, 2007.
- "1960 Electoral College Results". National Archives. November 5, 2019. Archived from the original on April 22, 2023.
