= JFK (film) =

1991 American political thriller film directed by Oliver Stone

- Theatrical release poster
- Directed by: Oliver Stone
- Screenplay by: Oliver Stone; Zachary Sklar
- Based on: On the Trail of the Assassins by Jim Garrison; Crossfire: The Plot That Killed Kennedy by Jim Marrs
- Produced by: A. Kitman Ho; Oliver Stone
- Starring: Kevin Costner; Kevin Bacon; Tommy Lee Jones; Laurie Metcalf; Gary Oldman; Michael Rooker; Jay O. Sanders; Sissy Spacek
- Cinematography: Robert Richardson
- Edited by: Joe Hutshing; Pietro Scalia
- Music by: John Williams
- Production companies: Le Studio Canal+; Regency Enterprises; Alcor Films; Ixtlan Corporation
- Distributed by: Warner Bros.
- Release date: December 20, 1991
- Running time: 188 minutes
- Country: United States
- Language: English
- Budget: $40 million
- Box office: $205.4 million

JFK is a 1991 American political thriller film co-written and directed by Oliver Stone. The film examines the investigation into the assassination of John F. Kennedy by New Orleans district attorney Jim Garrison, who came to believe that there was a government conspiracy to assassinate Kennedy and that Lee Harvey Oswald was a scapegoat. The film's screenplay was adapted by Stone and Zachary Sklar from the books On the Trail of the Assassins by Garrison and Crossfire: The Plot That Killed Kennedy by Jim Marrs. Kevin Costner stars as Garrison, with an ensemble supporting cast including Kevin Bacon, Sissy Spacek, Tommy Lee Jones, Gary Oldman, Joe Pesci, Donald Sutherland, Laurie Metcalf, and narration by Martin Sheen.

JFK's embrace of conspiracy theories made it controversial. Many major American newspapers ran editorials accusing Stone of spreading untruths, including the claim that Kennedy was killed as part of a coup d'état to install Vice President Lyndon B. Johnson in his place.

JFK was released by Warner Bros. on December 20, 1991. Despite the controversy, JFK received critical praise for its performances, directing, score, editing and cinematography. It also gradually picked up momentum at the box office after a slow start, grossing over $205 million worldwide, making it the sixth highest-grossing film of 1991 worldwide and Stone's highest-grossing film to date. It was nominated for eight Academy Awards, including Best Picture and won two for Best Cinematography and Best Film Editing.

It was the first of three films Stone made about American presidents, followed by Nixon (1995) and W. (2008).

== Plot ==
During his farewell address in 1961, outgoing President Dwight D. Eisenhower warns about the build-up of the military-industrial complex. He is succeeded by John F. Kennedy as president, whose time in office is marked by the Bay of Pigs Invasion, the Cuban Missile Crisis and the Indochina wars until his assassination in Dealey Plaza, Dallas, Texas, on November 22, 1963. Ex-Marine and suspected Soviet defector Lee Harvey Oswald is arrested for the murder of police officer J. D. Tippit and arraigned with both murders but is killed by nightclub owner Jack Ruby. New Orleans District Attorney Jim Garrison and his team investigate potential New Orleans links to the JFK assassination, including private pilot and activist David Ferrie, but their research is publicly rebuked by the federal government and Garrison closes the examination.

The subject is reopened in 1966 after Garrison reads the Warren Report and notices what he believes to be multiple inaccuracies, such as the single-bullet theory. Garrison and his staff interrogate people connected to Oswald and Ferrie, learning that the two were involved with the CIA in Operation Mongoose. One witness, Willie O'Keefe, a male prostitute serving five years in prison for solicitation, says that he witnessed Ferrie talking with a man called "Clay Bertrand" about assassinating Kennedy, and that he briefly met Oswald. Garrison and his team theorize Oswald never actually "defected" and was in fact an agent of the CIA who was betrayed and framed for the assassination.

In 1967, Garrison and his team ask several witnesses, including Jean Hill, a teacher who says she witnessed a gunman shooting from the "grassy knoll", a small hill, that Secret Service threatened her into saying three shots came from the Texas School Book Depository from which Oswald was said to have shot Kennedy, and her testimony was altered by the Warren Commission. Garrison's staff also test fire an empty Carcano rifle from the Depository and conclude that Oswald was too poor a marksman to make the shots, and that there was more than one shooter. Garrison comes to believe that "Bertrand" is really New Orleans businessman Clay Shaw. Garrison interviews Shaw, who denies having ever met Ferrie, O'Keefe or Oswald.

Some key witnesses become frightened and refuse to testify while others, such as Ruby and Ferrie, die in suspicious circumstances. Before his death, Ferrie tells Garrison that the CIA and the Mafia were working together to kill Fidel Castro, and that there was a conspiracy to kill Kennedy. Garrison meets a high-level figure in Washington, D.C., who identifies himself as "X", and who claims Kennedy's security in Dallas was deliberately neglected. He also suggests a coup d'état at the highest levels of government, implicating members of the CIA, the Mafia, the military-industrial complex, Secret Service, anti-Castro Cubans, the FBI, and then-Vice President Lyndon B. Johnson as either co-conspirators or as having motives to cover up the truth of the assassination. X suggests that Kennedy was killed because he wanted to pull the United States out of the Vietnam War, halt further actions against Cuba, and dismantle the CIA. X encourages Garrison to continue investigating and prosecute Shaw. Shortly afterwards, Garrison indicts Shaw with conspiring to murder Kennedy.

Garrison's marriage is strained when his wife Liz complains that he is spending more time on the case than with his own family. After a sinister phone call is made to their daughter, Liz accuses Garrison of being selfish and attacking Shaw only because of his homosexuality. Some of Garrison's staff begin to doubt his motives and disagree with his methods, and leave the investigation. One of them, Bill Broussard, is later revealed to have been an insider for the FBI for some time, and even plays a peripheral, undisclosed role in what seems to be an attempt to kidnap, murder or otherwise scare Garrison. In addition, Garrison is criticized in the media as wasting taxpayer money to investigate a conspiracy theory. Garrison suspects a connection with the assassination of Martin Luther King Jr. and the assassination of Robert F. Kennedy.

Shaw's trial takes place in 1969. Garrison presents the court with a dismissal of the single-bullet theory, proposing a scenario involving three assassins firing six shots and framing Oswald for the murders of Kennedy and Tippit, all for the purpose of installing Johnson as president so he could escalate the war in Vietnam and enrich the defense industry. However, the jury acquits Shaw after less than one hour of deliberation. While his prosecution has failed, Garrison wins his wife and children's respect for his determination and so repairs his relationship with his family.

== Cast ==
- Kevin Costner as Jim Garrison
- Kevin Bacon as Willie O'Keefe
- Tommy Lee Jones as Clay Shaw / Clay Bertrand
- Laurie Metcalf as Susie Cox
- Gary Oldman as Lee Harvey Oswald
- Michael Rooker as Bill Broussard
- Jay O. Sanders as Lou Ivon
- Sissy Spacek as Liz Garrison
- Joe Pesci as David Ferrie
- Beata Poźniak as Marina Oswald Porter
- Jack Lemmon as Jack Martin
- Walter Matthau as Senator Russell B. Long
- Donald Sutherland as Mr. X
- Ed Asner as Guy Banister
- Brian Doyle-Murray as Jack Ruby
- John Candy as Dean Andrews Jr.
- Sally Kirkland as Rose Cheramie
- Wayne Knight as Numa Bertel
- Pruitt Taylor Vince as Lee Bowers
- Tony Plana as Carlos Bringuier
- Vincent D'Onofrio as Bill Newman
- Dale Dye as General Y
- Lolita Davidovich as Beverly Oliver
- Ellen McElduff as Jean Hill
- John Larroquette as Jerry Johnson
- Willem Oltmans as George de Mohrenschildt
- Tomas Milian as Leopoldo
- Gary Grubbs as Al Oser
- Ron Rifkin as Mr. Goldberg / Spiesel
- Peter Maloney as Colonel Finck
- John Finnegan as Judge Haggerty
- Wayne Tippit as FBI Agent Frank
- Jo Anderson as Julia Ann Mercer
- Bob Gunton as News Anchor
- Frank Whaley as Imposter Oswald
- Jim Garrison as Earl Warren
- Martin Sheen as Narrator

== Production ==
Zachary Sklar, a journalist and a professor of journalism at the Columbia School of Journalism, met Garrison in 1987 and helped him rewrite a manuscript that he was working on about Kennedy's assassination. He changed it from a scholarly book in the third person to "a detective story – a whydunnit" in the first person. Sklar edited the book and it was published in 1988. While attending the Latin American Film Festival in Havana, Cuba, Oliver Stone met Sheridan Square Press publisher Ellen Ray on an elevator. She had published Jim Garrison's book On the Trail of the Assassins. Ray had gone to New Orleans and worked with Garrison in 1967. She gave Stone a copy of Garrison's book and told him to read it. He did and quickly bought the film rights with $250,000 of his own money to prevent talk going around the studios about projects he might be developing.

Kennedy's assassination had always had a profound effect on Stone: "The Kennedy murder was one of the signal events of the postwar generation, my generation." Stone met Garrison and grilled him with a variety of questions for three hours. Garrison stood up to Stone's questioning and then got up and left. His pride and dignity impressed the director. Stone's impressions from their meeting were that "Garrison made many mistakes. He trusted a lot of weirdos and followed a lot of fake leads. But he went out on a limb, way out. And he kept going, even when he knew he was facing long odds."

Stone was not interested in making a film about Garrison's life, but rather the story behind the conspiracy to kill Kennedy. He also bought the film rights to Jim Marrs' book Crossfire: The Plot That Killed Kennedy. One of the filmmaker's primary goals with JFK was to provide a rebuttal to the Warren Commission's report that he believed was "a great myth. And in order to fight a myth, maybe you have to create another one, a counter-myth." Even though Marrs' book collected many theories, Stone was hungry for more and hired Jane Rusconi, a recent Yale University graduate, to lead a team of researchers and assemble as much information about the assassination as possible while the director completed post-production on Born on the Fourth of July. Stone read two dozen books on the assassination while Rusconi read between 100 and 200 books on the subject.

By December 1989, Stone began approaching studios to back his film. While in pre-production on The Doors, he met with three executives at Warner Bros. Pictures who wanted him to make a film about Howard Hughes. However, Warren Beatty owned the rights and so Stone pitched JFK. Studio president and chief operating officer Terry Semel liked the idea. He had a reputation for making political and controversial films, including All the President's Men, The Parallax View, and The Killing Fields. Stone made a handshake deal with Warner Bros. whereby the studio would get all the rights to the film and put up $20 million for the budget. The director did this so that the screenplay would not be widely read and bid on, and he also knew that the material was potentially dangerous and wanted only one studio to finance it. Finally, Stone liked Semel's track record of producing political films.

=== Screenplay ===
When Stone set out to write the screenplay, he asked Sklar (who also edited Marrs' book) to co-write it with him and distill the Garrison and Marrs books and Rusconi's research into a script that would resemble what he called "a great detective movie". Stone told Sklar his vision of the film:

I see the models as Z and Rashomon, I see the event in Dealey Plaza taking place in the first reel, and again in the eighth reel, and again later, and each time we're going to see it differently and with more illumination.

Although he did employ ideas from Rashomon, his principal model for JFK was Z:

Somehow I had the impression that in Z you had the showing of the crime and then the re-showing of the crime throughout the picture until it was seen another way. That was the idea of JFK – that was the essence of it: basically, that's why I called it JFK. Not J dot F dot K dot. JFK. It was a code, like Z was a code, for he lives, American-style. As it was written it became more fascinating: it evolved into four DNA threads.

Stone broke the film's structure down into four stories: Garrison investigating the New Orleans connection to the assassination; the research that revealed what Stone calls, "Oswald legend: who he was and how to try to inculcate that"; the recreation of the assassination at Dealey Plaza; and the information that the character of "X" imparts on Garrison, which Stone saw as the "means by which we were able to move between New Orleans, local, into the wider story of Dealey Plaza." Sklar worked on the Garrison side of the story while Stone added the Oswald story, the events at Dealey Plaza and the "Mr. X" character. Sklar spent a year researching and writing a 550-page triple-spaced screenplay and then Stone rewrote it and condensed it closer to normal screenplay length. Stone and Sklar used composite characters, most notably the "Mr. X" character played by Donald Sutherland. This was a technique that would be criticized in the press. He was a mix of Richard Case Nagell and retired Air Force colonel Fletcher Prouty, another adviser for the film and who was a military liaison between the CIA and the Pentagon. Meeting Prouty was, for Stone, "one of the most extraordinary afternoons I've ever spent. Pretty much like in the movie, he just started to talk." According to Stone:

I feel this was in the spirit of the truth because Garrison also met a deep throat type named Richard Case Nagell, who claimed to be a CIA agent and made Jim aware of a much larger scenario than the microcosm of New Orleans.

The screenplay's early drafts suggested a four and a half-hour film with a potential budget of $40 million – double what Stone had agreed to with Warner Bros. The director knew film mogul Arnon Milchan and met with him to help finance the film. Milchan was eager to work on the project and launch his new company, Regency Enterprises, with a high profile film like JFK. Milchan made a deal with Warner Bros. to put up the money for the film. Stone managed to pare down his initial revision, a 190-page draft, to a 156-page shooting script.

There were many advisers for the film, including Gerald Hemming, a former Marine who claimed involvement in various CIA activities, and Robert Groden, a self-proclaimed photographic expert and longtime JFK assassination researcher and author.

Stone later published JFK: The Documented Screenplay, a heavily annotated version of the screenplay in which he cites sources for nearly every claim made in the film (ISBN 1557831270).

=== Casting ===
Trying to cast the role of Garrison, Stone sent copies of the script to Kevin Costner, Mel Gibson, and Harrison Ford. Initially, Costner turned Stone down. However, Costner's agent, Michael Ovitz, was a big fan of the project and helped Stone convince Costner to take the role. Before accepting the role, Costner conducted extensive research on Garrison, including meeting the man and his enemies. Two months after finally signing on to play Garrison in January 1991, his film Dances with Wolves won seven Academy Awards and so his presence greatly enhanced JFK's bankability in the studio's eyes.

Tommy Lee Jones was originally considered for another role that was ultimately cut from the film and Stone then decided to cast him as Shaw. In preparation for the film, Jones interviewed Garrison on three different occasions and talked to others who had worked with Shaw and knew him.

Stone originally wanted James Woods to play David Ferrie, but Woods turned it down. Stone also approached Willem Dafoe and John Malkovich, who both also turned down the role.

Stone considered Marlon Brando for the role of Mr. X, which eventually went to Donald Sutherland.

According to Gary Oldman, very little was written about Oswald in the script. Stone gave him several plane tickets, a list of contacts, and told him to do his own research. Oldman met with Oswald's wife, Marina, and her two daughters to prepare for the role. Beata Poźniak studied 26 volumes of the Warren Report and spent time living with Marina Oswald. Since the script contained few lines for the Oswalds, Poźniak interviewed acquaintances of the Oswalds in order to improvise her scenes with Gary Oldman.

Many actors were willing to waive their normal fees because of the nature of the project and to lend their support. Martin Sheen provided the opening narration. Jim Garrison played Chief Justice Earl Warren, during the scene in which he questions Jack Ruby in a Dallas jail and in a TV appearance. Assassination witness Beverly Oliver, who claims to be the "Babushka Lady" seen in the Zapruder film, also appeared in a cameo in Ruby's club. Sean Stone, Oliver Stone's son, plays Garrison's oldest son Jasper. Perry Russo, one of the sources for the fictional character Willie O'Keefe, appeared in a cameo as an angry bar patron who says Oswald should get a medal for shooting Kennedy.

=== Principal photography ===
The story revolves around Costner's Jim Garrison, with a large cast of well-known actors in supporting roles. Stone was inspired by the casting model of the WWII epic The Longest Day, which he had admired as a child: "It was realistic, but it had a lot of stars ... the supporting cast provides a map of the American psyche: familiar, comfortable faces that walk you through a winding path in the dark woods."

Cinematographer Robert Richardson was a week and a half into shooting City of Hope for John Sayles when he got word that Stone was thinking about making JFK. By the time principal photography wrapped on City of Hope, Richardson was ready to make Stone's film. To prepare, Richardson read up on various JFK assassination books starting with On the Trail of the Assassins and Crossfire: The Plot That Killed Kennedy.

The original idea was to film the opening sequence in 1.33:1 aspect ratio in order to simulate the TV screens that were available at the time of the assassination, then transition to 1.85:1 when Garrison began his investigation, and finally switch to 2.35:1 for scenes occurring in 1968 and later. However, because of time constraints and logistics, Richardson was forced to abandon this approach.

Stone wanted to recreate the Kennedy assassination in Dealey Plaza. His producers had to pay the Dallas City Council a substantial amount of money to hire police to reroute traffic and close streets for three weeks. He only had ten days to shoot all of the footage he needed and so he used seven cameras (two 35 mm and five 16 mm) and 14 film stocks. Getting permission to shoot in the Texas School Book Depository was more difficult. They had to pay $50,000 to put someone in the window from which Oswald was supposed to have shot Kennedy. They were allowed to film in that location only between certain hours with only five people on the floor at one time: the camera crew, an actor and Stone. Co-producer Clayton Townsend has said that the hardest part was getting the permission to restore the building to the way it looked back in 1963. It took five months of negotiation.

The production spent $4 million to restore Dealey Plaza to 1963 conditions. Stone used a variety of film stocks. Richardson said, "It depends whether you want to shoot in 35 or 16 or Super 8. In many cases the lighting has to be different." For certain shots in the film, Stone employed multiple camera crews shooting at once, using five cameras at the same time in different formats. Richardson said of Stone's style of direction, "Oliver disdains convention, he tries to force you into things that are not classic. There's this constant need to stretch." This forced the cinematographer to use lighting in diverse positions and rely very little on classic lighting modes. Shooting began on April 15, 1991, and ended on July 31, lasting 78 days with filming finished four-and-a-half months before the release date.

=== Editing ===
JFK marked a fundamental change in the way that Stone constructed his films: a subjective lateral presentation of the plot, with the editing's rhythm carrying the story. Stone brought in Hank Corwin, an editor of commercials, to help edit the film. Stone chose him because his "chaotic mind" was "totally alien to the film form." Stone also commented that Corwin "had not developed the long form yet. And so a lot of his cuts were very chaotic." Stone employed extensive use of flashbacks within flashbacks for a specific effect. He said in an interview:

I wanted to do the film on two or three levels – sound and picture would take us back, and we'd go from one flashback to another, and then that flashback would go inside another flashback ... I wanted multiple layers because reading the Warren Commission Report is like drowning.

Because of being shot on various sized film stocks, conventional 35mm film editing was impossible. Although digital editing was in nascent form, LightWorks and AVID were still not available as editing systems when editing began on JFK. For that reason, all the footage was transferred to 3/4" videotape and edited on videotape. The 35 mm film negative, along with the other sized film stocks were then conformed to match the videotape edit.

Years after its release, Stone said of the film that it "was the beginning of a new era for me in terms of film making because it's not just about a conspiracy to kill John Kennedy. It's also about the way we look at our recent history ... It shifts from black and white to color, and then back again, and views people from offbeat angles."

=== Music ===
Because of his enormous commitment to Steven Spielberg's Hook, which opened the same month as JFK, composer John Williams did not have time to compose a conventional score for the entire film. Instead he composed and conducted six musical sequences in full for JFK before he saw the film in its entirety. Soon after recording this music, he traveled to New Orleans where Stone was still shooting the film and saw approximately an hour's worth of edited footage and dailies. Williams remembers, "I thought his handling of Lee Harvey Oswald was particularly strong, and I understood some of the atmosphere of the film – the sordid elements, the underside of New Orleans." Stone and his team then actually cut the film to fit Williams' music after the composer had scored and recorded musical cues in addition to the six he had done prior to seeing the film. For the motorcade sequence, Williams described the score he composed as "strongly kinetic music, music of interlocking rhythmic disciplines." The composer remembered the moment he learned of Kennedy's assassination and it stuck with him for years. This was a significant factor in his deciding to work on the film. Williams said, "This is a very resonant subject for people of my generation, and that's why I welcomed the opportunity to participate in this film."

== Reception and criticism ==
=== Critical reaction ===
External videos
- "JFK and its Depiction of History", hosted by the American University School of Communication, January 22, 1992, C-SPAN

On review aggregator Rotten Tomatoes, JFK holds an approval rating of 85% based on 73 reviews and an average rating of 8.3/10. The site's critics consensus reads, "As history, Oliver Stone's JFK is dubious, but as filmmaking it's electric, cramming a ton of information and excitement into its three-hour runtime and making great use of its outstanding cast." On Metacritic, the film has a weighted average of 72 out of 100 based on 29 reviews, indicating "generally favorable" reviews. Audiences polled by CinemaScore gave the film an average grade of "A" on an A+ to F scale.

==== Pre-release ====
The film's production and release were subject to intense scrutiny and criticism. A few weeks after shooting had begun, on May 14, 1991, Jon Margolis wrote in the Chicago Tribune that JFK was "an insult to the intelligence". Five days later, The Washington Post ran a scathing article by national security correspondent George Lardner titled, "On the Set: Dallas in Wonderland" that used one of the drafts of the JFK screenplay to blast it for "the absurdities and palpable untruths in Garrison's book and Stone's rendition of it." The article pointed out that Garrison lost his case against Clay Shaw and that he inflated his case by trying to use Shaw's homosexual relationships to prove guilt by association. Stone responded to Lardner's article by hiring a public relations firm that specialized in political issues. Anthony Lewis in The New York Times stated the film "tells us that our government cannot be trusted to give an honest account of a Presidential assassination." Washington Post columnist George Will called Stone "a man of technical skill, scant education and negligible conscience."

Time ran its own critique of the film-in-progress on June 10, 1991, and alleged that Stone was trying to suppress a rival JFK assassination film based on Don DeLillo's 1988 novel Libra. Stone rebutted these claims in a letter to the magazine.

Stone split his time making the film, responding to criticism and conducting a publicity campaign that saw him "omnipresent from CBS Evening News to Oprah." The Lardner Post piece was reputed to have hit Stone the most because Lardner had a copy of the script. Stone recalls, "He had the first draft and I went through probably six or seven drafts."

==== Post-release ====
Upon theatrical release, The New York Times ran an article by Bernard Weinraub that called for intervention by the studio: "At what point does a studio exercise its leverage and blunt the highly charged message of a film maker like Oliver Stone?" The newspaper ran a review of the film by Vincent Canby who wrote, "Mr. Stone's hyperbolic style of film making is familiar: lots of short, often hysterical scenes tumbling one after another, backed by a soundtrack that is layered, strudel-like, with noises, dialogue, music, more noises, more dialogue." Pat Dowell, film critic for The Washingtonian, had her 34-word capsule review for the January issue rejected by her editor Jack Limpert on the grounds he did not want the magazine to give a positive review to a film he felt was "preposterous". Dowell resigned in protest.

Richard Corliss, Time's film critic, wrote:

Whatever one's suspicions about its use or abuse of the evidence, JFK is a knockout. Part history book, part comic book, the movie rushes toward judgment for three breathless hours, lassoing facts and factoids by the thousands, then bundling them together into an incendiary device that would frag any viewer's complacency. Stone's picture is, in both meanings of the word, sensational: it's tip-top tabloid journalism. In its bravura and breadth, JFK is seditiously enthralling; in its craft, wondrously complex.

The Miami Herald said, "the focus on the trivialities of personality conveniently prevents us from having to confront the tough questions [Stone's] film raises." Gene Siskel and Roger Ebert both gave the film positive reviews on their television show. Writing for the Chicago Tribune, Siskel called the film "thoroughly compelling" and suggested that while it contained "gross alterations of fact", Stone had "the right to speculate on American history". Ebert praised the film in his review for the Chicago Sun-Times, saying,

The achievement of the film is not that it answers the mystery of the Kennedy assassination, because it does not, or even that it vindicates Garrison, who is seen here as a man often whistling in the dark. Its achievement is that it tries to marshal the anger which ever since 1963 has been gnawing away on some dark shelf of the national psyche.

Rita Kempley in The Washington Post wrote, "Quoting everyone from Shakespeare to Hitler to bolster their arguments, Stone and Sklar present a gripping alternative to the Warren Commission's conclusion. A marvelously paranoid thriller featuring a closetful of spies, moles, pro-commies and Cuban freedom-fighters, the whole thing might have been thought up by Robert Ludlum."

New York Newsday published two articles on Boxing Day: "The Blurred Vision of JFK" and "The Many Theories of a Jolly Green Giant". A few days later, the Chicago Sun-Times followed suit with "Stone's Film Trashes Facts, Dishonors J.F.K." Jack Valenti, then president and chief executive of the Motion Picture Association of America, denounced Stone's film in a seven-page statement. He wrote: "In much the same way, young German boys and girls in 1941 were mesmerized by Leni Riefenstahl's Triumph of the Will, in which Adolf Hitler was depicted as a newborn God. Both JFK and Triumph of the Will are equally a propaganda masterpiece and equally a hoax. Mr. Stone and Leni Riefenstahl have another genetic linkage: neither of them carried a disclaimer on their film that its contents were mostly pure fiction." Stone recalls in an interview, "I can't even remember all the threats, there were so many of them."

TIME magazine ranked it the fourth best film of 1991, while also including it in "Top 10 Historically Misleading Films" in 2011.

Ebert named Stone's film as the year's best and one of the top ten films of the decade as well as one of The Great Movies. Gene Siskel ranked it the seventh best film of the year. The Sydney Morning Herald named JFK as the best film of 1991. Entertainment Weekly ranked it the 5th Most Controversial Movie Ever.

Ebert's future colleague Richard Roeper was less complimentary: "One can admire Stone's filmmaking skills and the performances here while denouncing the utter crapola presented as 'evidence' of a conspiracy to murder." Roeper applauded the film's "dazzling array of filmmaking techniques and a stellar roster of actors" but criticized Stone's narrative: "As a work of fantastical fiction, JFK is an interesting if overblown vision of a parallel universe. As a dramatic interpretation of events, it's journalistically bankrupt nonsense."

Harry Connick Sr., the New Orleans district attorney who defeated Garrison in 1973, criticized Stone's view of the assassination: "Stone was either unaware of the details and particulars of the Clay Shaw investigation and trial or, if he was aware, that didn't get in his way of what he perceived to be the way the case should have been." In his book Reclaiming History: The Assassination of President John F. Kennedy, a history of the assassination published 16 years after the film's release, Vincent Bugliosi devoted an entire chapter to Garrison's prosecution of Shaw and Stone's subsequent film. Bugliosi lists thirty-two separate "lies and fabrications" in Stone's film and describes the film as "one continuous lie in which Stone couldn't find any level of deception and invention beyond which he was unwilling to go." David R. Wrone stated that "80 percent of the film is in factual error" and rejected the premise of a conspiracy involving the CIA and the so-called military-industrial complex as "irrational". Warren Commission investigator David Belin called the film "a big lie that would make Adolf Hitler proud". Former Indiana Representative Floyd Fithian, who had served on the House Select Committee on Assassinations, said the film had manipulated the past. Kennedy's son, John F. Kennedy Jr., refused to watch the film, "because that's not entertainment for me... people, historians, filmmakers...are going to take time and money studying (the assassination)." He cared little about the controversy, stating that regardless of the truth, it would not bring his father back. Clint Hill, a Secret Service agent who was with Kennedy when he was shot, criticized the film, calling it "absurd".

The "General Y" shown as organizing the assassination of President Kennedy was unmistakably Major General Edward Lansdale. Historian Max Boot would be highly critical of the General Y story:

Lansdale... was a critic, not an advocate, of the Americanization of the Vietnam War. He was never a proponent of expensive weapons systems; he argued that the best weapon was a well-trained soldier, diplomat, or spy who would deal sympathetically with the local populace...A staunch advocate of spreading liberty abroad, Lansdale was scarcely likely to undermine liberty at home by participating in a military coup d'état against the lawfully elected president—a man he had worked for and respected, even if he was less enamored of the president's younger brother.... Far from plotting to kill John F. Kennedy, as numerous conspiracy-mongers continue to allege, Lansdale was as grief-stricken as the rest of the country by his shocking death and as uncertain about what would come next.

=== Box-office ===
JFK was released in theaters on December 20, 1991. In its first week of release, JFK tied with Beauty and the Beast for fifth place in the U.S. box office and its critics began to say it was a flop. Warner Bros. executives argued that this was at least partly because the film's long running time meant it had had fewer screenings than other films. Box-office picked up momentum, however, in part due to a $15 million marketing campaign from the studio. By the first week in January 1992, it had grossed over $50 million worldwide, eventually earning over $200 million worldwide and $70 million in the United States during its initial run.

Garrison's estate subsequently sued Warner Bros. Pictures for a share of the film's profits, alleging fraud perpetrated through a book-keeping practice known as "Hollywood accounting". The lawsuit contended that JFK made in excess of $150 million worldwide but the studio claimed that, under its "net profits" accounting formula, the film earned no money, and that Garrison's estate did not receive any of the more than $1 million net profits income he was due.

=== Awards and nominations ===
Award	Category	Recipients	Result
Academy Awards	Best Picture	Oliver Stone and A. Kitman Ho	Nominated
Academy Awards	Best Director	Oliver Stone	Nominated
Academy Awards	Best Actor in a Supporting Role	Tommy Lee Jones	Nominated
Academy Awards	Best Screenplay Based on Material Previously Produced or Published	Oliver Stone and Zachary Sklar	Nominated
Academy Awards	Best Cinematography	Robert Richardson	Won
Academy Awards	Best Film Editing	Joe Hutshing and Pietro Scalia	Won
Academy Awards	Best Original Score	John Williams	Nominated
Academy Awards	Best Sound	Michael Minkler, Gregg Landaker and Tod A. Maitland	Nominated
BAFTA Awards	Best Actor in a Supporting Role	Tommy Lee Jones	Nominated
BAFTA Awards	Best Adapted Screenplay	Oliver Stone and Zachary Sklar	Nominated
BAFTA Awards	Best Editing	Joe Hutshing and Pietro Scalia	Won
BAFTA Awards	Best Sound	Tod A. Maitland, Wylie Stateman, Michael D. Wilhoit, Michael Minkler and Gregg Landaker	Won
Golden Globe Awards	Best Motion Picture – Drama		Nominated
Golden Globe Awards	Best Director	Oliver Stone	Won
Golden Globe Awards	Best Actor – Motion Picture Drama	Kevin Costner	Nominated
Golden Globe Awards	Best Screenplay	Oliver Stone and Zachary Sklar	Nominated
Directors Guild of America Award	Outstanding Directing - Feature Film	Oliver Stone	Nominated

Upon winning the Golden Globe Award for Best Director – Motion Picture, Stone said in his acceptance speech: "A terrible lie was told to us 28 years ago. I hope that this film can be the first step in righting that wrong."

Entertainment Weekly ranked JFK as one of the 25 "Powerful Political Thrillers". In 2012, the Motion Picture Editors Guild listed the film as the ninth best-edited film of all time based on a survey of its membership.

== Legislative impact ==
The final report of the Assassination Records Review Board (ARRB) partially credited concern over the conclusions in JFK with the passage of the President John F. Kennedy Assassination Records Collection Act of 1992, also known as the JFK Act.

The ARRB stated that the film "popularized a version of President Kennedy's assassination that featured U.S. government agents from the Federal Bureau of Investigation (FBI), the Central Intelligence Agency (CIA), and the military as conspirators." While describing the film as "largely fictional", the ARRB acknowledged Stone's point that official records were to be sealed from the public until 2029, and his suggestion that "Americans could not trust official public conclusions when those conclusions had been made in secret." By ARRB law, all existing assassination-related documents were to be made public by 2017, and most are now released.

== Home media and alternate versions ==
The original theatrical cut of JFK was released on VHS and LaserDisc on May 20, 1992.

A "Director's Cut" of the film, extending it to 205 minutes, was released on VHS on January 20, 1993, and on LaserDisc on February 10, 1993. Limited Edition VHS and LaserDisc sets included a new 90-minute documentary entitled Beyond JFK: The Question of Conspiracy.

The Director's Cut was released on DVD on April 8, 1997.

On January 16, 2001, the Director's Cut was re-released on DVD as part of the Oliver Stone Collection box-set, with the film on one disc and supplemental material on the second. Stone contributed several extras to this edition, including an audio commentary, two multimedia essays, and 54 minutes' worth of deleted/extended scenes with optional commentary by Stone.

On November 11, 2003, a "Special Edition" DVD of the Director's Cut was released with the film on one disc and all of the extras from the 2001 edition on a second disc, in addition to the 1993 documentary Beyond JFK: The Question of Conspiracy.

The Director's Cut was released on Blu-ray on November 11, 2008. The disc featured many of the extras included on the previous DVD releases, including the Beyond JFK: The Question of Conspiracy documentary.

The theatrical cut was not released on physical media in the US for many years after the first 1992 laserdisc and VHS releases, although it was released on DVD in the United Kingdom as a poor quality non-anamorphic transfer. The theatrical cut and the director's cut were both made available for digital download and streaming in the United States.

On December 19, 2023, Shout! Factory, through their Shout Select label, released both the theatrical and extended versions together as a boxset on UHD and Blu-ray. The director's cut was made available on the 4K disc, but the theatrical cut was only been included as a remastered Blu-ray.

On August 11, 2026, Shout! Factory released the theatrical cut separately on UHD and Blu-ray.

== In popular culture ==
Seinfeld spoofed the film's "Magic Bullet" scene in its 1992 episode "The Boyfriend" (Wayne Knight acted in both the JFK courtroom scene and Seinfeld parody).

The Simpsons episode "Whacking Day" includes an episode of Itchy & Scratchy featuring "guest director" Oliver Stone. The episode recreates Lee Harvey Oswald's murder with Itchy as Jack Ruby and Scratchy as Oswald.

NFL Films created a parody based on theories the Super Bowl III was fixed.

The "back and to the left" scene was parodied on an episode on the cult animated sitcom The Critic.

The film was briefly discussed in Chuck Klosterman's 2023 book The Nineties.

In 2013, the DVD extra “Beyond JFK” was used by researcher Sean Murphy to note high quality frames of the James Darnell film to support a theory that a man standing on the Depository front steps during the assassination, referred to as "prayer man", was Oswald.

== See also ==
- Executive Action, a 1973 film that presents the assassination of John F. Kennedy from a conspiracy point of view.
- Ruby, a 1992 film centering around Jack Ruby that depicts a conspiracy to kill Kennedy.
- November 1963, a 2026 film that portrays a mafia plot to kill Kennedy.
- Edward Lansdale § JFK film
