= On the Trail of the Assassins =

1988 book by Jim Garrison

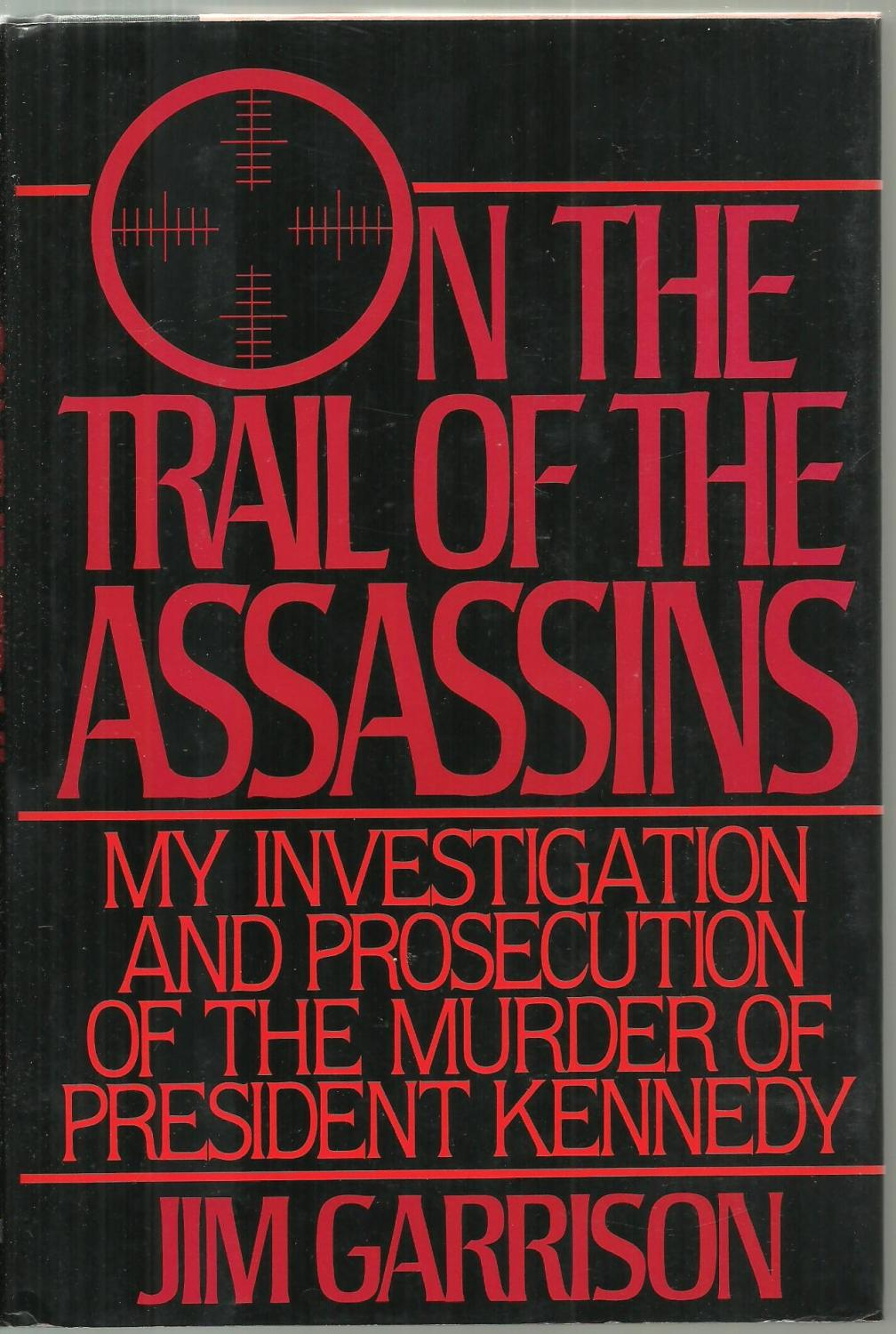
- First edition cover
- Author: Jim Garrison
- Language: English
- Subject: John F. Kennedy assassination
- Publisher: Sheridan Square Press
- Publication date: November 1988
- Publication place: United States
- Media type: Print (hardcover & paperback), Audible Audio Edition, Amazon Kindle
- Pages: 342 pp (first trade edition, hardcover)
- ISBN: 094178102X
- OCLC: 18383568

On the Trail of the Assassins is a 1988 book by former New Orleans District Attorney (DA) Jim Garrison. Written a few years before his death, he looks back on his office's investigation of the November 1963 assassination of John F. Kennedy in Dallas. Garrison became involved in the case because the accused assassin, Lee Harvey Oswald, had spent the summer of 1963 in New Orleans. In the book, Garrison charts his own transformation from accepting the official account of what occurred in Dallas, to believing that members of the U.S. intelligence community "were responsible for the assassination and had carried it out in order to stop President Kennedy's efforts to break with Cold War foreign policy."

The book details how his DA office assembled what they felt was compelling evidence of a plot to kill JFK, and were preparing in early 1967 to bring charges against two alleged co-conspirators based in New Orleans: David Ferrie and Clay Shaw. When Ferrie died suddenly before he could be indicted, Garrison narrowed his prosecution to Shaw. Garrison goes on to describe what he regards as systematic government obstruction, including placement of undercover agents on his DA team, to sabotage his case. In what would be the only criminal trial for John Kennedy's murder, Shaw was acquitted in March 1969.

Upon its publication in late 1988, On the Trail of the Assassins sold moderately well. It then received a huge sales boost in 1991 when Oliver Stone's film JFK credited Garrison's book as one of its primary sources.

== Background ==
On the Trail of the Assassins is a retelling of the investigation and unsuccessful prosecution of Clay Shaw. But Garrison also weaved in personal recollections, which turned the book into a memoir as well as an attack on the Warren Commission's lone-gunman theory. He asserts in the Introduction that unlike authors of the hundreds of other JFK assassination books, he was not just a critic "analyzing the dry evidence" of the case; he was "a participant, a prosecutor and an investigator."

In an early manuscript draft, Garrison told the story from a third-person point of view. His editor Zachary Sklar (who is thanked at the start of the Acknowledgements) urged Garrison to recast the book in the first person to make it more of a memoir. Garrison eventually agreed to the change and, as James DiEugenio observes, "I think most people today would say that was a good choice." To emphasize the autobiographical dimensions of the story, the subtitle of the first edition was: "My Investigation and Prosecution of the Murder of President Kennedy". In a later edition, the subtitle was reworded as "One Man's Quest to Solve the Murder of President Kennedy".

Garrison had to write portions of the book from memory because he was unable to access many of his office records, including grand jury transcripts (his successor as New Orleans DA, Harry Connick Sr., had ordered all of Garrison's DA records to be burned). As a consequence, there are inaccuracies in Trail, according to Garrison biographer Joan Mellen. For example, she says it was not U.S. Senator Russell Long who first prompted Garrison to question the Warren Report; it was Congressman Hale Boggs (D-LA), a member of the Warren Commission, who privately expressed misgivings to Garrison in March 1964.

Mellen notes that before selecting "On the Trail of the Assassins", Garrison contemplated other titles: The Execution; The War Machine; A Game of Kings; Coup D'Etat; and A Farewell to Justice. He was using the latter title when he shopped the book around in the mid-1980s. A Farewell to Justice was rejected by twenty publishers prior to its acceptance by Sheridan Square Press.

Garrison dedicates the book to members of his DA staff in the 1960s—Frank Klein, Andrew Sciambra, James Alcock, Louis Ivon, D'Alton Williams, Alvin Oser, and Numa Bertel—who he says "never stopped fighting to bring out the truth. They just ran out of time."

== Description ==
The book opens on Friday, November 22, 1963, when Garrison heard the shocking news from Dallas. After news bulletins reported that Oswald lived in New Orleans in mid-1963, Garrison convened an emergency Sunday meeting with staff members. He asked them to check all possible associates of Oswald. They soon learned that the accused assassin was seen around town that summer with David Ferrie, a colorful local character known as an expert pilot and avid anti-communist. An assistant DA also heard that on November 22, Ferrie embarked on a lengthy driving trip to Texas, through a heavy thunderstorm, supposedly to go ice skating. On Monday, Garrison brought Ferrie in for questioning, listened to a confusing rationale for the ice skating trip, and then ordered his investigators to take Ferrie to the police station, to be booked and held in jail for FBI questioning.

Garrison says he initially had no reason to doubt the "Oswald-did-it" narrative being explained to the American public by the media, FBI, and Warren Commission. He was himself an ex-FBI agent with deep respect for the Bureau. He traces his "awakening" to a chance conversation with Louisiana's Sen. Russell Long in autumn of 1966. The subject of JFK's assassination arose, and Long said, "Those fellows on the Warren Commission were dead wrong. There's no way in the world that one man could have shot up Jack Kennedy that way." That conversation prompted Garrison to want to educate himself about the case. He read the 26 volumes of Warren Commission Hearings and Exhibits, and found what he believed were numerous contradictions, "promising leads that were never followed up", and conclusions that did not comport with the evidence. He opted to launch his own investigation.

He began by going to 544 Camp Street, which Oswald stamped on leaflets he distributed for the pro-Castro Fair Play for Cuba Committee (FPCC). Oswald had made the New Orleans TV news in August 1963 when he was arrested for fighting with anti-Castro Cubans who objected to his passing out FPCC leaflets. Garrison noticed that around the corner from 544 Camp Street was a side door with address 531 Lafayette Street. He recalled it was the entrance in 1963 to a private detective agency run by Guy Banister (1901-1964), a one-time head of the Chicago FBI and a person active in far-right politics. Garrison found it odd that Banister's entrance on 531 Lafayette, and Oswald's FPCC entrance on 544 Camp, would be in the same corner building and lead to the exact same suite of offices. As Garrison dug deeper, he suspected Oswald was only posing as a "Marxist-oriented" pamphleteer:

This was the first evidence I encountered that Lee Oswald had not been a "communist" or a "Marxist" of any kind. What appeared to be considerably more probable, now that I had seen the setup at 544 Camp, was that Guy Banister—or someone associated with him—had been using Oswald as an agent provocateur. For what purpose, and under whose auspices, remained a mystery.

Another early lead involved Jack Martin, one of Banister's detectives. On the afternoon of the assassination, Martin was out drinking with his boss. When they returned to Banister's office, they quarreled and Banister pistol-whipped Martin, hospitalizing him. Garrison interviewed Martin who said that in the summer of 1963, Banister's office was a hub of anti-Castro activity, that David Ferrie "practically lived there", and Oswald was a regular visitor, sometimes in closed-door meetings with Banister. Garrison writes that he started to see a reason for Oswald's temporary relocation to New Orleans in mid-1963:

[A] summer of ostentatiously handing out pro-Castro leaflets in New Orleans reinforced the image of a crazed communist assassin. In the intelligence community, there is a term for this kind of manipulated behavior designed to create a desired image: sheepdipping. It seemed to me that Oswald had been in New Orleans to be sheepdipped under the guidance of Guy Banister and that he had been sent back to Dallas when the mission was accomplished.

Garrison relates a meeting he had with an old law school acquaintance, Dean Andrews. On November 23, Andrews was telephoned by "Clay Bertrand" and asked to fly to Dallas to represent Oswald, who was being held in police custody. When Garrison pressured Andrews for specifics about Bertrand, Andrews was evasive and warned the DA it was unsafe to press too hard on these matters. Garrison sent his investigators to inquire around the city whether anyone knew "Clay Bertrand". They heard from a dozen sources that the name was an alias of Clay Shaw, a distinguished New Orleans businessman and director of the International Trade Mart.

Next, the DA team uncovered a curious incident. In September 1963, Oswald was seen by hundreds of people in the rural town of Clinton, Louisiana. He arrived in a limousine with two older men, who fit the description of David Ferrie and Clay Shaw. It was a memorable day in Clinton because there was a major voter registration drive for black residents. While the two older men sat in the car, Oswald stood for hours in the voter registration line. He also submitted a job application to work in the mental hospital in nearby Jackson. When Oswald's face appeared on TV on November 22, the Clinton townspeople remembered he was the young man who came to their town in September.

By February 1967, Garrison believed that he had amassed enough evidence to summon David Ferrie before a grand jury, and that there were signs of CIA involvement in the assassination. Up to that point, Garrison had tried to run his investigation in secrecy. But then on February 17, a New Orleans newspaper headline revealed that the DA was conducting an inquiry into the JFK assassination. News reporters somehow learned that David Ferrie was one of the targets and surrounded his apartment. Ferrie deteriorated under the strain. He phoned Louis Ivon on Garrison's staff and said, "I'm a dead man. From here on, believe me, I'm a dead man." On February 22, Ferrie died under mysterious circumstances. The coroner ruled "natural causes", but the death scene in Ferrie's apartment—which contained two unsigned typewritten suicide notes—suggested otherwise. Even though Garrison had lost a central player in the probe, he proceeded with the Shaw prosecution, arresting him on March 1, 1967. The New Orleans DA office presented its case against Shaw to a grand jury, which returned an indictment.

In the months preceding the January 1969 trial, Garrison cites what he viewed as a pattern of government obstruction. He encountered unusual non-cooperation between branches of law enforcement. His requests to extradite witnesses from Ohio and Nebraska were blocked by the governors. When he subpoenaed FBI and CIA officials, the U.S. Attorney in Washington, D.C. "declined" to serve the New Orleans DA's subpoenas, or the officials pled executive privilege and refused to testify. He found out too late that his team had been infiltrated. He discovered that some of his case files were stolen, while others were shared with Shaw's defense lawyers.

Garrison tells of a seemingly ideal witness, New York accountant Charles Spiesel, who came to the DA's office late in the investigation and said he met Ferrie and Shaw during a trip to New Orleans and heard them discussing the assassination of the President. What Garrison's team did not know, and had insufficient time to learn, was that Spiesel had a history of mental illness which would discredit him, and the prosecution, in the eyes of the jury. Garrison writes:

On cross-examination, the chief defense counsel uncannily seemed to know just what questions to ask Spiesel. First, Dymond asked if Spiesel had ever publicly complained about "hypnosis and psychological warfare" being used on him. Spiesel replied that he indeed had been hypnotized in New York and New Jersey...in the period between 1948 and 1954. Asked who hypnotized him, Spiesel said he did not always know. He said he could tell that hypnosis was being tried "when someone tries to get your attention—catch your eye. That's a clue right off." ... Then Dymond zeroed in for the kill. Was it not a fact, he asked, that when Spiesel's daughter left New York to go to school at Louisiana State University he customarily fingerprinted her? Spiesel replied in the affirmative. Dymond then asked if it were not also a fact that he customarily fingerprinted his daughter again when she returned at the end of the semester. Again, the witness acknowledged that this was true. Dymond then asked him why he fingerprinted her. Spiesel explained that he did this, in effect, to make sure that the daughter who was returning from L.S.U. was the same one he had sent there.

Garrison adds that while he tried not to register concern in his face, he was "swept by a feeling of nausea" as he realized the extent of the opposition's sophisticated operation which was destroying his case. He later told a friend that Spiesel helped "illuminate what we were up against, how naïve we were in the over-all strategic game we were caught up in and – in the final analysis – how very naïve we probably were to enter the game in the first place."

The jurors were "spellbound" by the Zapruder film, which Garrison screened six times. The 26-second film visually challenged the Warren Commission's contention that JFK was killed by shots coming only from behind. Garrison writes, "While the jury accepted my argument that there had been a conspiracy, it was not then aware of Shaw's role as a clandestine C.I.A. operative. Unconvinced of his motivation, the jury acquitted him of the charges." In the book's final chapter, Garrison offers his assessment of the "Secret Sponsors" of the plot against Kennedy.

== Reception ==
The U.S. House Select Committee on Assassinations (HSCA) Chief Counsel G. Robert Blakey hypothesized—both in the 1979 HSCA report and in his 1981 book, The Plot to Kill the President (co-written with Richard Billings)—that Mafia leaders, especially Carlos Marcello and Santo Trafficante, were principal conspirators in the JFK assassination. In contrast, Garrison claimed that while organized crime likely played a supporting role in the assassination, they could not have engineered an operation of that magnitude. To bolster his position, he asked Carl Oglesby to provide an Afterword for Trail, entitled "Is the Mafia Theory a Valid Alternative?" In The New York Times review, Ronnie Dugger wrote: "Mr. Garrison argues in his book that the Mob is the 'number one' false suspect in the assassination. He tells us that he cleaned up rackets and clip joints in New Orleans, denies an allegation that he received a gambling credit from an ally of Mr. Marcello's and asserts that he does not know Mr. Marcello and never came 'upon any evidence that he was the Mafia kingpin the Justice Department says he is.'"

In an advertising blurb for the book, Norman Mailer praised Garrison for presenting "the most powerful detailed case yet made that President Kennedy's assassination was the product of a conspiracy, and that the plotters and key operators came not from the Mob, but the CIA." In a Times-Picayune review, Jack Wardlow said On the Trail of the Assassins was "rife with paranoia". In the same newspaper edition, Iris Kelso called the book "riveting" and "told in a well-modulated, wry and witty style that is Garrison at his best."

The hardback edition of On the Trail of the Assassins found a ready audience, "selling 32,000 copies in its first five months." Hardback sales eventually reached about 40,000. In 1991, the book enjoyed a giant sales boost when filmmaker Oliver Stone used it—along with Jim Marrs' Crossfire: The Plot That Killed Kennedy—as the basis for the controversial film, JFK. To capitalize, Warner Books reissued Trail in mass market paperback, and it quickly jumped to bestseller status. The media attacks on Stone's film brought a new round of criticism against Garrison's book. For instance, in May 1991, Jon Margolis wrote in The Dallas Morning News:

[S]ome insults to intelligence and decency rise (sink?) far enough to warrant objection. Such an insult now looms. It is JFK, Oliver Stone's film based largely on a book called On the Trail of the Assassins, by Jim Garrison. For those who have forgotten or are too young to remember, Garrison was the bizarre New Orleans district attorney who, in 1969, claimed that the assassination of President John Kennedy was a conspiracy by some officials of the Central Intelligence Agency. Garrison even managed to put one hapless fellow on trial for his role in this alleged conspiracy. Having no case, Garrison lost in court. Nothing if not tenacious, he expanded his arguments for the book, published in 1988.... And lest you think that only movie directors and bizarre district attorneys have no shame, consider this: Warner Books, a division of Time-Warner, the largest publishing-entertainment conglomerate in human history, is paying Garrison $137,500 to re-issue the book when the movie comes out.

== Film adaptation ==
Oliver Stone first became aware of On the Trail of the Assassins at the 9th annual Havana Film Festival in December 1987. At the time, he had no plans to make a JFK assassination film. In a speech at a 2017 conference, he recalled how Ellen Ray of Sheridan Square Press (whose firm was preparing Garrison's book for publication) "trapped" Stone on a slow elevator. She gave him the "elevator pitch" for the book, and pushed an early copy of it on him. He said half-jokingly at the conference:

I stumbled into this... Ellen Ray of Sheridan Press, great person...she gave me this book, Jim Garrison's Trail, in an elevator in Havana in 1987. I thought she was another lunatic. She wouldn't stop talking. A socialist elevator, seven floors, in Havana, takes about 20 minutes. So I gotta listen to this lunatic telling me "Garrison, Garrison". I take the book, On the Trail of the Assassins: "OK, I'll read it someday." I read it about 3-4 months later and by God, it's a helluva thriller. That's where it started… It [the book] was certainly a delight, as a mystery fan.

He added that he quickly saw the dramatic potential of Garrison's book: "I am a dramatist, so of course, I look for the story, I look for the narrative. And certainly one of the things that attracted me to JFK was the possibility of a great narrative here. I tried to put that into the film. The hunt for the clues of who would kill him and why."

When he was defending his film in a January 1992 Premiere essay, Stone wrote the following about On the Trail of the Assassins and its author:

After reading widely in the assassination literature, I chose to make the story of former New Orleans district attorney Jim Garrison (played by Kevin Costner) the narrative framework of the movie. I was taken with the way in which a man starts to investigate one small corner of the conspiracy—in this case, the summer of 1963 in New Orleans, where Oswald passed the time—and comes to realize that a small-town whodunit has global repercussions. And moreover, he finds that his life and his family's life are darkened forever, all because he has opened up the floorboards and let in the light on a taboo subject that some powerful people wanted to remain hidden. Like a Capra everyman, he is darkened and sacrificed, yet wins his soul in the end. There are many flaws in the real Garrison (arrogance and paranoia, to name a couple), but we did not deal with them in the film, because you either had to make Garrison the issue or make Kennedy the issue. I chose Kennedy.
