= Dean Andrews Jr. =

American attorney (1922–1981)

- Dean Andrews Jr. during his perjury trial, August 1967
- Born: Dean Adams Andrews, Jr. October 8, 1922; New Orleans, Louisiana, U.S.
- Died: April 15, 1981 (aged 58); Metairie, Louisiana, U.S.
- Education: Tulane University Law School (LLB)
- Occupation: Attorney
- Criminal information
- Conviction: Perjury (1967)

Dean Adams Andrews Jr. (October 8, 1922 – April 15, 1981) was an attorney in New Orleans, Louisiana. During the trial of Clay Shaw, he was questioned by New Orleans District Attorney Jim Garrison regarding his Warren Commission testimony in which he had mentioned a man named Clay Bertrand having called him shortly after the assassination of John F. Kennedy asking him to represent Lee Harvey Oswald in Dallas, Texas. In August 1967, Andrews was convicted on three counts of perjury for lying to a grand jury in his previous testimony.

== Biography ==
Andrews was a lawyer for Carlos Marcello, boss of the New Orleans crime family, beginning in the early 1950s.

=== Warren Commission testimony ===
On November 25, 1963, Andrews informed the Federal Bureau of Investigation (FBI) that three days earlier (on the day of the assassination of President Kennedy) he received a telephone call from a Clay Bertrand who asked him whether he would be willing to represent Lee Harvey Oswald, the accused assassin. Andrews subsequently repeated his claim regarding the phone call in testimony before the Warren Commission in July 1964. Andrews described Bertrand as a "swinging cat" (what Andrews defined as a bisexual) who occasionally guaranteed fees for some of Andrews' homosexual clients.

Two weeks after the assassination, the FBI reported that Andrews had admitted that Bertrand was a "figment of his imagination". The FBI report stated that Andrews had been hospitalized at the time with pneumonia and was under heavy sedation. However, Andrews would later deny the FBI report, claiming that he had never suggested that Bertrand might not be real.

A Secret Service report issued in December 1963, two weeks after the assassination of President Kennedy, stated that Andrews said that Lee Harvey Oswald had visited Andrews' office on approximately three occasions in June and July 1963, seeking legal advice from Andrews concerning his citizenship status, his wife's status and his undesirable discharge from the Marine Corps. Andrews described his encounters with Oswald in testimony before the Warren Commission in July 1964.

=== Trial of Clay Shaw ===
In the spring of 1967, New Orleans District Attorney Jim Garrison — who over the course of several months had been investigating the assassination of President Kennedy — asserted that Clay Bertrand was actually New Orleans businessman Clay Shaw. Garrison alleged that Shaw used the alias Clay Bertrand among New Orleans' gay society. Garrison further believed that Shaw and a group of right-wing activists, including David Ferrie and Guy Banister, were involved in a conspiracy with elements of the Central Intelligence Agency (CIA) in the Kennedy assassination. Garrison arrested Shaw on March 1, 1967. Shaw was booked on conspiracy to commit murder, but denied that he had ever used the name Clay Bertrand. Shaw was eventually acquitted of the charges.

Andrews contradicted his testimony before the Warren Commission when, after appearing before the Orleans Parish grand jury, he stated in an interview on June 28, 1967 that Bertrand was not Shaw but was Eugene Davis, his friend and client. Davis denied in an affidavit that he was Bertrand or the person who suggested that Andrews go to Dallas to help Oswald. Andrews was subsequently convicted on three counts of perjury for lying to the grand jury on August 14, 1967. Before his perjury trial had begun he stated "I'll be the only person ever convicted in the assassination of President Kennedy, and I don't know beans about it". During the trial he claimed "I don't know from nothing. What I got is a vivid imagination. The moral to all this, brother-in-law, is keep your big mouth shut". On February 25, 1969, Andrews testified during the trial of Clay Shaw that the name "Clay Bertrand was a figment of [his] imagination" and that he had been "carrying on a farce" in order to prevent "bring[ing] a lot of heat and trouble to someone who didn't deserve it."

== Portrayals ==
Andrews was portrayed by John Candy in Oliver Stone's 1991 film JFK.
