= Walter Sheridan =

- Born: November 20, 1925; Utica, New York, U.S.
- Died: January 13, 1995 (aged 69); Derwood, Maryland
- Occupation: Government investigator
- Spouse: Nancy
- Children: Five
- Military career
- Allegiance: United States
- Branch: United States Navy
- Service years: World War II

Walter James Sheridan (20 November 1925 - 13 January 1995) was an investigator for various agencies of the US government. He is best known for his role in the prosecution of Jimmy Hoffa, on which subject he published a book in 1972.

== Background ==
Sheridan was born in 1925 in Utica, New York. His father ran the Montclair, a small hotel, and a restaurant called Sheridan's. He attended the Utica Free Academy, becoming the senior class president and a quarterback on the football team. During World War II, he served in the US Navy's Submarine Service, and according to some sources worked for the Office of Naval Intelligence. After the war he benefited from the G.I. Bill, graduating from Fordham University in 1950.

== Career ==
Sheridan joined the Federal Bureau of Investigation, resigning after four years over J. Edgar Hoover's focus on anti-Communism. As Sheridan later put it, "Hoover was more interested in guys who were Communists for 15 minutes in 1931 than he was in guys who were stealing New Jersey." He was then a National Security Agency investigator for three years.

Sheridan was an investigator for the United States Senate Select Committee on Improper Activities in Labor and Management, recruited to its staff by Robert F. Kennedy in 1957. He was a regional coordinator for John F. Kennedy's 1960 presidential campaign, and a coordinator for the Robert F. Kennedy presidential campaign, 1968. After Robert Kennedy was appointed Attorney General in 1961, Sheridan became a special assistant to Kennedy working as the effective chief of a team investigating Jimmy Hoffa and the Teamsters. From 1965 to 1970, he was an NBC News special correspondent, producing documentaries on crime and gun control among other issues; his unit received a Peabody Award for work on the 1967 Detroit riot. Sheridan also covered the 1967 prosecution of Clay Shaw by Jim Garrison, and in 1967 produced an hour-long special for NBC on the assassination of John F. Kennedy.

In the 1970s and 80s, he was a principal aide to the United States Senate Committee on the Judiciary and the U.S. Senate Labor and Human Resources Committee. In 1972 he published The Fall and Rise of Jimmy Hoffa, wherein he presented what he had learnt about Hoffa and the Teamsters over the last seventeen years of his life he had spent investigating him. It drew primarily on transcripts of government hearings and court trials. Budd Schulberg produced the introduction. The Industrial and Labor Relations Review described the book as a "necessary and welcome antidote" to the more flattering portrayals of other Hoffa biographers.

He died of lung cancer on 13 January 1995 at his home in Derwood, Maryland. He was survived by his wife Nancy and five children. Senator Ted Kennedy paid tribute to Sheridan as "an extraordinary investigator and an extraordinary human being".

His personal papers are held by the JFK Library. He was portrayed by Dennis Redfield in the 1985 miniseries Robert Kennedy and His Times, and later by Tom Everett in the 2000 film Thirteen Days, about the Cuban Missile Crisis.

== In Movies ==
Sheridan is mentioned in the documentary The JFK Assassination: The Jim Garrison Tapes (1992) pertaining to his work on the 1967 NBC hour-long special about the assassination of John F. Kennedy.

== Books ==
- The Fall and Rise of Jimmy Hoffa, Saturday Review Press, 1972. ISBN 978-0841502024
