= Perry Russo =

Witness in a Kennedy assassination conspiracy case

- Born: Perry Raymond Russo; May 14, 1941; New Orleans, Louisiana, United States
- Died: August 16, 1995 (aged 54); New Orleans, Louisiana, United States
- Occupations: Insurance salesman, taxi driver

Perry Raymond Russo (May 14, 1941 – August 16, 1995) was an American insurance salesman who became the key witness for the prosecution in the trial of Clay Shaw in New Orleans in 1969. Russo claimed that in September 1963, he witnessed businessman and civic leader Clay Shaw conspiring with Lee Harvey Oswald and David Ferrie to assassinate U.S. President John F. Kennedy.

== Friend of David Ferrie ==
Russo was an insurance salesman from Baton Rouge, Louisiana. He attended Tulane University, received a bachelor's degree from Loyola University New Orleans in 1964, and attended one year of law school at Loyola. He moved away from New Orleans in September 1965. Russo came forward after his friend David Ferrie died on February 22, 1967, while being investigated by New Orleans District Attorney Jim Garrison in regard to Kennedy's death. In four television and newspaper interviews that Russo gave, he talked at length about Ferrie. He said that Ferrie had told him about a month before the assassination: "We will get him, and it won't be long," and on another occasion, "You know we can get Kennedy if we want him."

Russo said nothing in the interviews about Oswald, Shaw, or a conspiracy. When a television reporter asked him on February 24 if Ferrie had ever mentioned Oswald's name, Russo said, "No. I had never heard of Oswald until the television [coverage] of the assassination."

However, when he was interviewed by Garrison's office on February 27, Russo described a roommate of Ferrie's in New Orleans as having "sort of dirty blond hair and a husky beard … a typical beatnik, extremely dirty." When Russo was shown a picture of Oswald, he said that Oswald was the person whom Ferrie had introduced to him as his roommate sometime between May and October 1963. When shown a picture of Shaw, Russo said he saw him and Ferrie talking in a car at Ferrie's service station. However, Russo still said nothing about Shaw or Oswald conspiring with Ferrie to murder Kennedy. Russo added that if he were hypnotized he may have total recall on names and places and dates.

Garrison arranged to have Russo interrogated three times while hypnotized, the first time while also under an injection of sodium thiopental, known popularly as "truth serum". Russo described a conspiracy plot, with Shaw (using the alias "Bertrand") and a rifle-toting "Leon" Oswald at Ferrie's apartment when Russo was visiting in mid-September 1963. Russo said Ferrie told him, "We are going to kill John F. Kennedy" and "it won't be long." According to Jim Garrison, Russo had already testified to this, and that the hypnosis interrogation was for the purposes of verification of testimony.

== Testimony against Clay Shaw ==
At Shaw's preliminary hearing on March 15, 1967, Russo repeated the claims he had made under hypnosis. When asked on cross-examination why he had not gone to the authorities two months after the alleged meeting, when Kennedy was assassinated, Russo replied, "I had an involvement with school, which was more pressing to me."

Russo named two witnesses who could corroborate his story of attending a party at Ferrie's apartment in September 1963 in which the assassination plot was made. The first, Russo's former girlfriend, appeared on an NBC News program about the Garrison investigation on June 19, 1967, and denied being at Ferrie's apartment, and said that she never even met Ferrie until 1965. The second, a friend of Russo's, told NBC News that he was at Ferrie's apartment then but saw nobody resembling Oswald or Shaw.

Russo failed two polygraph examinations ordered by Garrison, on March 8 and June 19, and during the second he confessed to the polygraph operator that his story was not true. Walter Sheridan, a former FBI agent and aide to Robert F. Kennedy who was investigating the Garrison accusations for NBC News, reported,

"In my conversations with Perry Russo, he has stated that his [preliminary hearing] testimony against Clay Shaw may be a combination of truth, fantasy, and lies. He says he wishes he had never gotten into this, but now he feels he has no choice but to go through with it. He said he’s afraid if he changed his testimony, that Garrison might indict him for perjury . . . Russo said ‘The hell with truth, the hell with justice. You’re asking me to sacrifice myself for Clay Shaw, and I won’t do it.’"

At a press conference with Garrison the day after the NBC broadcast, Russo accused Sheridan of attempting to bribe him into changing his story, and of alternating between promises and threats in seeking his help to "wreck the Garrison investigation." NBC News denied the allegations, and Sheridan said that Russo had solicited offers from them. George Lardner of The Washington Post who reported on the story said a week or two earlier that Russo solicited a bribe from him in order to divulge "weaknesses" in his testimony.

Garrison had Russo testify two years later at the Clay Shaw trial, which ended in a not-guilty verdict after less than an hour of jury deliberation.

== Later life ==
In August 1970, Perry Russo and another man were arrested for burglarizing a New Orleans residence, stealing property valued at eight thousand dollars, and being in possession of a stolen safe-deposit key. Garrison’s office declined to prosecute on the burglary and theft charges. Russo pled guilty to possessing the stolen key and was given a three-month suspended sentence.

In 1971, two years after Shaw's not-guilty verdict, Russo told one of Shaw's lawyers that he never saw Shaw at Ferrie's apartment, and that Garrison's office had done "a complete brainwashing job" on him. In a second, tape-recorded interview with a former Garrison investigator and two of Shaw's attorneys, Russo spoke of Garrison and his staff telling him before the trial that they had a contract with Life magazine for $25,000, and that "after the Shaw conviction" they would "either give that to me or see somehow that I got a lot of it for my trouble." Russo also said, "I guess I always knew [Shaw] had nothing to do with anything." To others, Russo continued to assert that he had seen Ferrie, Shaw, and Oswald conspiring to kill President Kennedy.

Journalist James Phelan, who covered the Garrison investigation for The Saturday Evening Post, later explained,

"He [Russo] told me [in March 1967] that he was caught in the middle of this thing, that if he stuck to his story, Shaw and his friends and lawyers would clobber him. If he changed his story, then Garrison would charge him with perjury and chuck! — there would go his job with Equitable Life. He told me all he was concerned about was his own position, that he wished he'd never opened his mouth about it, wished he could go back to the day before he shot off his mouth up in Baton Rouge."

Oliver Stone's 1991 film JFK has Russo's testimony given by a fictional character named "Willie O'Keefe" (played by Kevin Bacon). Stone has said that in addition to Perry Russo, O’Keefe was a composite of three other Garrison witnesses — David Logan, Raymond Broshears, and William Morris. In addition, Russo made a cameo appearance as an angry bar patron in the scene where news of the President's death is received. George Lardner of The Washington Post, noting that in June 1967 Russo had invited him to "bribe him to disclose 'weaknesses' in his testimony", wrote that it was a "convenient device" for Stone to have eliminated Russo from his script.

Offering a counter view to Stone's JFK, author and New Orleans native Nicholas Lemann wrote an opinion piece in the January 1992 issue of GQ criticizing Garrison's prosecution of Shaw and expressing the view that it had embarrassed the city of New Orleans. Lemann's only reference to Russo described him as "a young insurance salesman-cum-grifter who claimed to have overheard Shaw and Ferrie discussing the assassination at a party." In November 1992 Russo sued the publisher, Advance Magazine Publishers Inc. d/b/a Conde Nast Publications, for defamation. Noting that "Lemann intended to communicate both the longstanding controversy over Russo's testimony against Shaw, and Russo's admittedly strange existence on the fringes of respectable society", District judge Charles Schwartz Jr. dismissed Russo's claims against the publisher.

He was interviewed for the 1992 documentary The JFK Assassination: The Jim Garrison Tapes. Russo, who had been working as a driver for United Cab in New Orleans, died of a heart attack at age 54.
