= Clay Bertrand =

Alleged alias used by two people in the assassination of John F. Kennedy

Clay Bertrand is an alleged alias associated with two people connected to various investigations regarding the assassination of President John F. Kennedy in 1963.

== Contacts ==
New Orleans attorney Dean Andrews Jr. testified to the Warren Commission in June 1964 that he received a call from "Clay Bertrand," the day after the assassination of Kennedy, asking him to fly to Dallas to represent the suspected assassin, Lee Harvey Oswald. The FBI had reported that two weeks after the assassination, Andrews, who had been hospitalized with pneumonia, said he was under heavy sedation and had concluded that the call had been a "figment of his imagination".

Nearly three years later on March 2, 1967, the New Orleans district attorney Jim Garrison asserted that "Clay Bertrand" was actually New Orleans businessman Clay Shaw who had conspired with Lee Harvey Oswald and David Ferrie to kill Kennedy. Shaw, who had been arrested and booked with conspiracy to commit murder, denied that he had ever used the name. An FBI document to President Lyndon B. Johnson's advisor W. Marvin Watson at the time of this development indicated that the FBI had been unable to locate an individual by the name "Clay Bertrand." Garrison later wrote in his account of the case, On the Trail of the Assassins, that his investigators had been told by multiple informants that Shaw regularly used the name Clay Bertrand. However, one of Garrison's investigators, Andrew Sciambra, later told writer Edward Jay Epstein that they had never found Bertrand. Another of Garrison's team, Lou Ivon, had sent Garrison a memo in February 1967 telling him that he had found no evidence that "Bertrand" existed.

Shortly after appearing before the Orleans Parish grand jury, Andrews stated in an interview on June 28, 1967 that "Bertrand" was not Shaw but was Eugene Davis, his friend and client. Davis denied in an affidavit that he was "Bertrand" or the person who suggested that Andrews go to Dallas to help Oswald. Andrews was subsequently convicted on three counts of perjury for lying to the grand jury on August 14, 1967. On February 25, 1969, Andrews testified during the trial of Clay Shaw that the name "'Clay Bertrand' was a figment of [his] imagination" and that he had been "carrying on a farce" in order to prevent "bring[ing] a lot of heat and trouble to someone who didn't deserve it."

Garrison attempted to present evidence connecting Shaw to the "Bertrand" alias. His key witness Perry Russo identified Shaw as a man named "Clem Bertrand" who he had met at David Ferrie's apartment alongside Ferrie and Oswald. "Bertrand", Ferrie, and Oswald had allegedly discussed a plan to kill Kennedy and arrange alibis for themselves. However, previous accounts of Russo's statement did not mention "Bertrand" or an assassination plot. Shaw's defense argued that Russo's evidence was unreliable, having been obtained after he was hypnotized and drugged with sodium pentothal. Shaw's booking officer, Aloysius Habighorst, reported that Shaw had given the alias "Clay Bertrand" when Habighorst asked if he used any aliases, presenting a fingerprint card under the name "Clay Bertrand" containing Shaw's fingerprints and signature. However, he was barred from testifying by the judge, who held that the statement was not admissible as Shaw's lawyer was not present during the questioning. The judge added that he "seriously doubted" Shaw had made the alleged statement in the first place.

On March 1, 1969, the 34-day trial concluded when the jury acquitted Shaw after deliberating less than an hour.

== See also ==
- List of fictitious people
