= Holland McCombs =

American journalist (1901–1991)

James Holland McCombs (1901 – June 29, 1991) was an American journalist. He primarily worked for Time magazine as a foreign correspondent and bureau chief.

== Early life ==
Holland McCombs was born in 1901 on Woodley Farm, on land that is now the campus of the University of Tennessee at Martin in Martin, Tennessee. As a teenager, he was a reporter for the Martin Mail newspaper. He worked a number of jobs in his earlier life, including sugar chemist, field hand, semi-professional baseball player, salesman, and travel bureau operator. He attended, but dropped out of University of Tennessee at Martin.

== Career ==
McCombs was hired at Time by Henry Luce in 1935 as a correspondent. He was a foreign correspondent, contributing editor, war correspondent, and bureau chief for the Southwest, Mexico, Brazil, and Argentina while with Time. In 1963, he was bureau chief in Dallas, Texas, during the assassination of John F. Kennedy. He investigated the assassination for six years and supported the one-man assassin theory and discredited the grassy knoll theory. He remained Dallas bureau chief until his retirement from Time in March 1971. He also worked for Life, Fortune, March of Time, Architectural Fortum, Letters, Sports Illustrated, Time-Life Books and Time-Life Television. He was associate editor of Fortune.

In 1957, he collaborated on the book King Ranch with Tom Lea III.

== Personal life ==
McCombs lived in San Antonio, Texas. From 1947 he was a friend of Clay Shaw. He died on June 29, 1991, aged 89, at his home in San Antonio.

== Awards and legacy ==
McCombs donated US$100,000 to renovate the UTM Child Development Center and donated a collection of books, articles, and papers to the University of Tennessee at Martin.

The Holland McCombs Center at the University of Tennessee at Martin is named for him.
