= Julia Ann Mercer =

Julia Ann Mercer was an eyewitness to an event which preceded the assassination of John F. Kennedy. Mercer said she saw a truck located at the base of the grassy knoll (Dealey Plaza) prior to the passage of the presidential motorcade on November 22, 1963. Although Dallas, Texas, policemen were standing close by, the truck was not moved from the area.

Mercer said she saw a man leave the truck, which was parked approximately halfway up on the sidewalk. The vehicle protruded into Elm Street and partially impeded traffic from passing. The man who departed the truck climbed the grassy knoll, according to Mercer. Another man stayed in the truck. According to both Dallas County Sheriff's and FBI reports, Mercer was unable to identify the driver of the truck. However, Mercer told New Orleans District Attorney Jim Garrison in January 1968 that her statement had been altered, that the signature on it was not hers, and that she had twice identified the truck driver as Jack Ruby. Mercer drove off. The truck left before the motorcade appeared.

Mercer gave a deposition to the Dallas sheriff's office which stated that the man who got out of the truck carried what appeared to be a gun case. Mercer estimated that the case was around three and half to four feet in length. She signed an affidavit before the sheriff's department on November 22, 1963. Mercer was not summoned as a witness by the Warren Commission, which investigated the murder of John F. Kennedy.

Mark Lane tried to speak with Mercer, who left Dallas later. Lane told Playboy in 1967 that he had been unable to find Mercer, and that she no longer resided in Dallas, Texas. However, New Orleans District Attorney Jim Garrison claims that he offered to locate Mercer for testimony to the House Select Committee on Assassinations, but that his offer, while noted in the Committee's report, was not followed up on.
