= Trial of Clay Shaw =

JFK assassination conspiracy trial

State v. Clay Shaw
- Full case name: State of Louisiana v. Clay L. Shaw
- Decided: March 1, 1969; 57 years ago
- Verdict: Not guilty

Court membership
- Judge sitting: Edward Haggerty

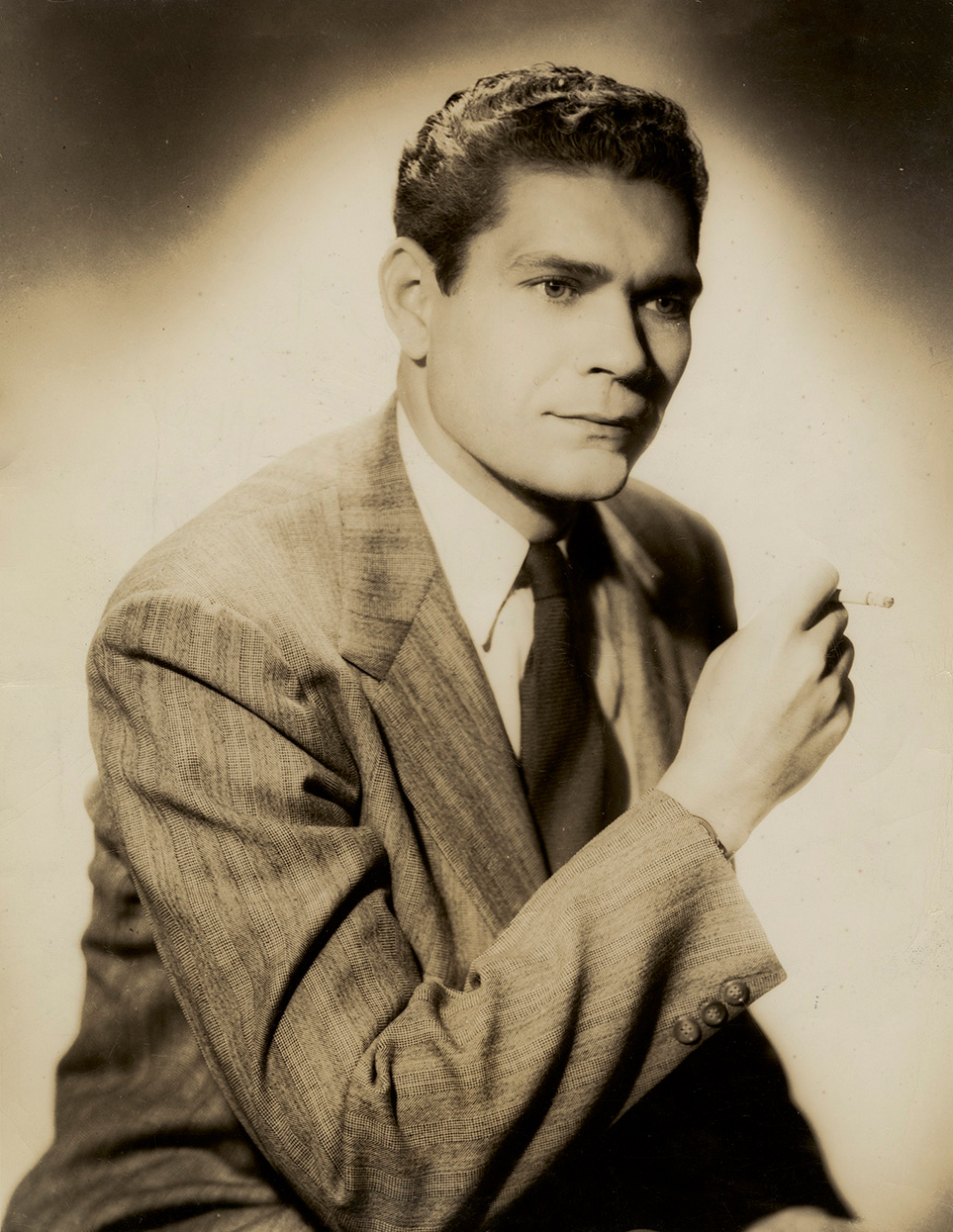
Clay Shaw was acquitted by the jury after less than an hour of deliberation.

On March 1, 1967, New Orleans District Attorney Jim Garrison arrested and charged New Orleans businessman Clay Shaw with conspiring to assassinate President Kennedy, with the help of Lee Harvey Oswald, David Ferrie, and others. On January 29, 1969, Shaw was brought to trial in Orleans Parish Criminal Court on these charges. On March 1, 1969, a jury took less than an hour to find Shaw not guilty. It remains the only criminal trial to be brought for the JFK assassination.

== Key persons and witnesses ==
- Jim Garrison, District Attorney of New Orleans, who believed, at various points, that the JFK assassination had been the work of Central Intelligence Agency personnel, anti-Castro Cuban exiles, "a homosexual thrill killing," and ultra right-wing activists. "My staff and I solved the case weeks ago," Garrison announced in February 1967. "I wouldn't say this if we didn't have evidence beyond a shadow of a doubt."
- Clay Shaw, a successful businessman, playwright, pioneer of restoration in New Orleans' French Quarter, and director of the International Trade Mart in New Orleans.
- David Ferrie, a former Eastern Airlines pilot and associate of Guy Banister. Ferrie drove from New Orleans to Houston on the night of the assassination with two friends, Alvin Beauboeuf and Melvin Coffey. The trip was investigated by the New Orleans Police Department, the Houston Police, the Federal Bureau of Investigation, and the Texas Rangers. These investigative units said that they were unable to develop a case against Ferrie, and Garrison initially accepted their conclusions. Three years later, Garrison became suspicious of the Warren Commission conclusions about the assassination after a chance conversation with Louisiana Senator Russell B. Long. Ferrie died on February 22, 1967, less than a week after news of Garrison's investigation broke in the media. Garrison later called Ferrie "one of history's most important individuals".
- Perry Russo, who, after Ferrie's death, informed Garrison's office that he had known Ferrie in the early 1960s and that Ferrie had spoken about assassinating the President. He became Garrison's main witness when he claimed to have overheard Ferrie plotting the assassination with a white-haired man named Clem Bertrand, whom he later identified in court as Shaw.

== Background ==
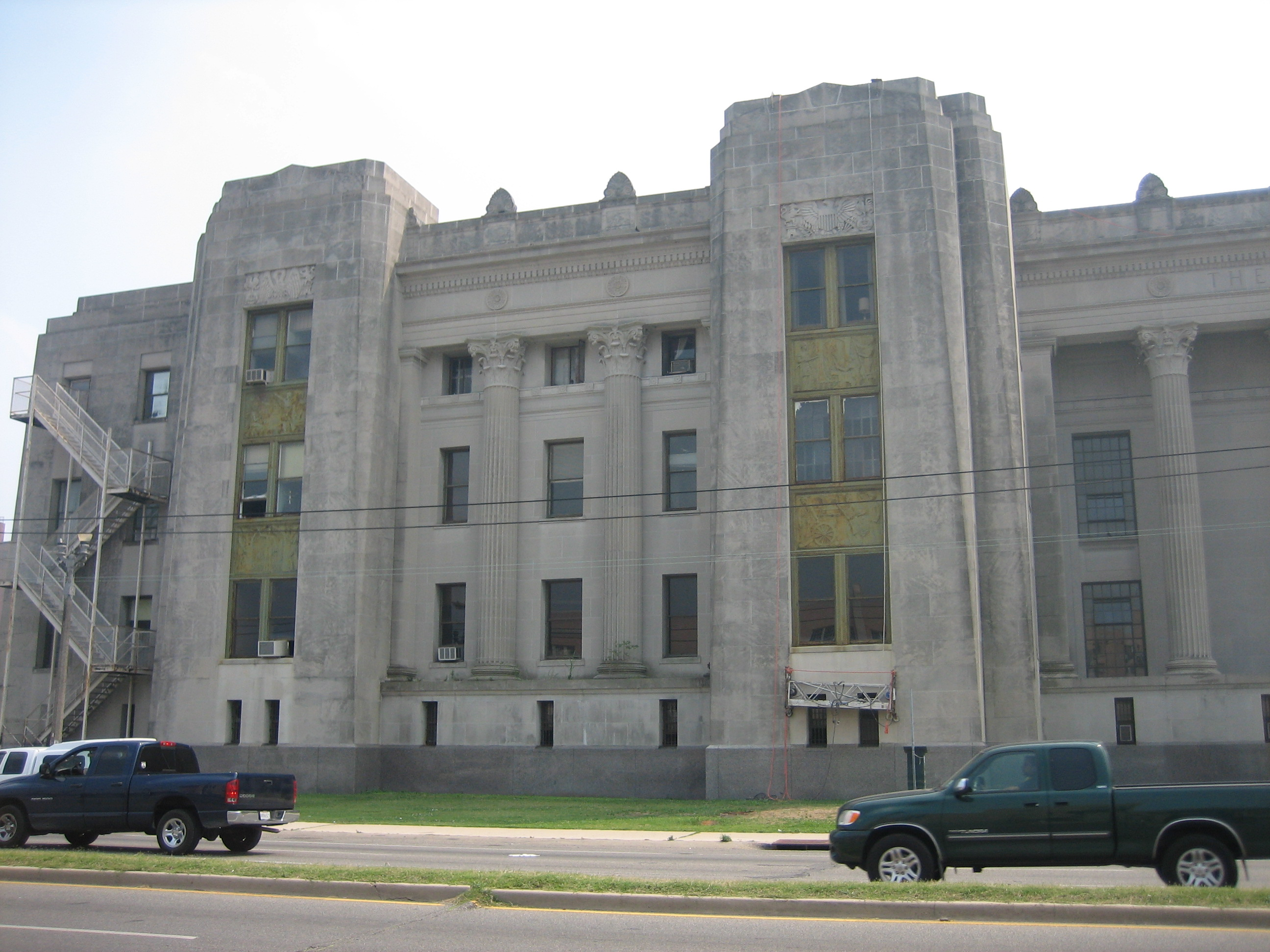
The trial was held at the Criminal Courts Building at Tulane & Broad in Mid-City New Orleans

The origins of Garrison's case can be traced to an argument between New Orleans residents Guy Banister and Jack Martin. On November 22, 1963, the day that President John F. Kennedy was assassinated, Banister pistol whipped Martin after a heated exchange. (There are different accounts as to whether the argument was over phone bills or missing files.) Over the next few days, Martin told authorities and reporters that Banister had often been in the company of a man named David Ferrie who, Martin said, might have been involved in the assassination of John F. Kennedy. Martin told the New Orleans police that Ferrie knew accused assassin Lee Harvey Oswald going back to when both men had served together in the New Orleans Civil Air Patrol and that Ferrie "was supposed to have been the getaway pilot in the assassination." Martin also said that Ferrie had driven to Dallas the night before the assassination, a trip which Ferrie explained as research for a prospective business venture to determine "the feasibility and possibility of opening an ice skating rink in New Orleans."

Some of this information reached New Orleans DA Garrison, who quickly arrested Ferrie and turned him over to the Federal Bureau of Investigation (FBI), which interviewed Ferrie and Martin on November 25. Martin told the FBI that Ferrie might have hypnotized Oswald into assassinating Kennedy. The FBI considered Martin unreliable. Nevertheless, the Bureau interviewed Ferrie twice about Martin's allegations. The FBI also interviewed about twenty other persons in connection with the allegations, but said it was unable to develop a substantial case against Ferrie, and released him with an apology. Garrison later wrote that the FBI "took the surprising step of issuing a news story saying that it had not requested he [Ferrie] be picked up." The 1970s inquiry by the United States House Select Committee on Assassinations (HSCA) concluded that the FBI's "overall investigation ... at the time of the assassination was not thorough".

In the autumn of 1966, Garrison began to re-examine the Kennedy assassination. Guy Banister had died of a heart attack in 1964, but Garrison re-interviewed Martin, who told the New Orleans DA that Banister and his associates were involved in stealing weapons and ammunition from armories and in gunrunning. Garrison believed that the men were part of an arms-smuggling ring supplying anti-Castro Cubans with weapons."

Journalist James Phelan said Garrison told him that the assassination was a "homosexual thrill killing." As Garrison continued his investigation he became convinced that a group of right-wing activists, which he believed included Ferrie, Banister, and Shaw (director of the International Trade Mart in New Orleans), were involved in a conspiracy with elements of the Central Intelligence Agency (CIA) to kill President Kennedy. Garrison would later say that the motive for the assassination was anger over Kennedy's foreign policy, especially Kennedy's efforts to find a political, rather than a military, solution in Cuba and Southeast Asia, and his efforts toward a rapprochement with the Soviet Union. Garrison also believed that Shaw, Banister, and Ferrie had conspired to set up Oswald as a patsy in the JFK assassination. News of Garrison's investigation was reported in the New Orleans States-Item on February 17, 1967.

On February 22, 1967, less than a week after the newspaper broke the story of Garrison's investigation, David Ferrie, then his chief suspect, was found dead in his apartment from a brain aneurysm. Garrison suspected that Ferrie had been murdered despite the coroner's report that his death was due to natural causes. According to Garrison, the day news of the investigation broke, Ferrie had called his aide Lou Ivon and warned that "I'm a dead man".

With Ferrie dead, Garrison began to focus his attention on Clay Shaw, director of the International Trade Mart. Garrison had Shaw arrested on March 1, 1967, charging him with being part of a conspiracy in the JFK assassination.. At the New Orleans police station, when Officer Aloysius Habighorst asked Shaw whether he used any aliases, Shaw replied (according to Habighorst), "Clay Bertrand". This was noted on the arrest sheet and fingerprint card, but was disallowed during the trial for being improperly obtained.

Earlier, Garrison had been searching for a "Clay Bertrand", a man referred to in the Warren Commission report. New Orleans attorney Dean Andrews testified to the Warren Commission that while he was hospitalized for pneumonia, he received a call from "Clay Bertrand" the day after the assassination, asking Andrews to fly to Dallas to represent Oswald. According to FBI reports, Andrews later said that this Bertrand phone call was a figment of his imagination. Andrews testified to the Warren Commission that the reason he told the FBI this was because of FBI harassment.

In his book On the Trail of the Assassins, Garrison says that after a long search of the New Orleans French Quarter, his staff was informed by the bartender at the tavern Cosimo's that "Clay Bertrand" was the alias that Clay Shaw used. According to Garrison, the bartender felt it was no big secret and "my men began encountering one person after another in the French Quarter who confirmed that it was common knowledge that "Clay Bertrand" was the name Clay Shaw went by." However, a memo from investigator Lou Ivon to Garrison stated that as of February 25, 1967, Ivon had been unable to locate a Clay Bertrand despite numerous inquiries and contacts.

In December 1967, Garrison appeared on a Dallas television program and claimed that a photograph taken in Dealey Plaza immediately after the assassination depicted a federal agent in plain clothes picking up and walking away with a .45 caliber bullet. He said that the bullet was not entered into evidence for the Warren Commission and was proof that another gunman was involved in the assassination. The photograph also showed Dallas Deputy Sheriff Buddy Walthers looking on with a uniformed Dallas policeman. Walthers stated the following week that the photograph was taken approximately 10 minutes after the assassination, and that the finding was "nothing significant". He said that it appeared to be blood on the grass or possibly a piece of skull. Walthers added: "If it had been a bullet, it would have been significant."

When Garrison's evidence was presented to a New Orleans grand jury, Shaw was indicted on a charge that he conspired with Ferrie, Oswald, and others named and charged to murder Kennedy. A three-judge panel upheld the indictment and ordered Shaw to a jury trial.

Following Shaw's arrest Attorney General Ramsey Clark stated that the FBI had already investigated Shaw over the assassination but had found no evidence of his involvement. Later Clark said that he had been in error and no investigation had taken place.

== Trial ==
On February 6, 1969, Garrison took 42 minutes to read his 15-page opening statement to the jury. Garrison stated that he would prove that Kennedy was shot from multiple locations; that Oswald conspired with Shaw as early as June 1963; that Shaw, Oswald, and Ferrie traveled to Clinton, Louisiana, where they were observed by a witness; that Oswald transported the gun identified by the Warren Commission as the assassination rifle to the Texas School Book Depository and that this gun took part in the assassination; that the shot that killed Kennedy came from a different direction; that Oswald escaped from the Texas School Book Depository in a station wagon driven by another man; and that Shaw received mail under the name "Clay Bertrand".

Garrison believed that Clay Shaw was the mysterious "Clay Bertrand" mentioned in the Warren Commission investigation. In the Warren Commission Report, New Orleans attorney Dean Andrews claimed that he was contacted the day after the assassination by a "Clay Bertrand" who requested that he go to Dallas to represent Oswald.

At the trial, the prosecution sought to have entered into evidence a fingerprint card containing Clay Shaw's signature and admission to using the alias "Clay Bertrand." In regard to this, Judge Edward Haggerty, after dismissing the jury, conducted a day-long hearing, in which he ruled the fingerprint card inadmissible. He said that two policemen had violated Shaw's constitutional rights by not permitting the defendant to have his lawyer present during the fingerprinting. Judge Haggerty also announced that Officer Habighorst had violated Miranda v. Arizona and Escobedo v. Illinois by not informing Clay Shaw that he had the right to remain silent. The judge said that Habighorst had violated Shaw's rights by allegedly questioning him about an alias, adding, "Even if he did [ask the question about an alias] it is not admissible." Judge Haggerty exclaimed, "If Officer Habighorst is telling the truth — and I seriously doubt it!" The judge finished with the statement, "I do not believe Officer Habighorst!"

On February 14, Roger Craig, a Dallas deputy sheriff, testified that during the assassination he was standing on the far side of Dealey Plaza across from the Texas School Book Depository. Craig said that immediately afterwards he ran to where the shooting occurred and saw a man that he later identified as Oswald run down the slope away from the building and get into a green station wagon driven by a man with dark complexion. That same day, Carolyn Walther, a Dallas resident, testified that she observed within an open window of the School Book Depository a man in a white shirt holding a gun accompanied by another man wearing a brown suit coat.

Garrison's key witness against Clay Shaw was Perry Russo. Russo testified that he had attended a party at the apartment of anti-Castro activist David Ferrie. At the party, Russo said that Oswald (whom Russo said was introduced to him as "Leon Oswald"), David Ferrie, and "Clem Bertrand" (who Russo identified in the courtroom as Clay Shaw) had discussed killing Kennedy. The conversation included plans for the "triangulation of crossfire" and alibis for the participants. Russo's version of events has been questioned by some historians and researchers, such as Patricia Lambert, once it became known that some of his testimony was induced by hypnotism and by the drug sodium pentothal, sometimes called "truth serum."

Moreover, a memo detailing a pre-hypnosis interview with Russo in Baton Rouge, along with two hypnosis session transcripts, had been given to Saturday Evening Post reporter James Phelan by Garrison. There were differences between the two accounts. Both Russo and Assistant D.A. Andrew Sciambra testified under cross examination that more was said at the interview, but omitted from the pre-hypnosis memorandum. James Phelan testified that Russo admitted to him in March 1967 that a February 25 memorandum of the interview, which contained no recollection of an "assassination party," was accurate. In several public interviews, such as one shown in the video The JFK Assassination: The Jim Garrison Tapes, Russo reiterates the same account of an "assassination party" that he gave at the trial.

In addition to the issue of Russo's credibility, Garrison's case also included other questionable witnesses, such as Vernon Bundy (a heroin addict), and Charles Spiesel, who testified that he had been repeatedly hypnotized by government agencies. Defenders of Garrison, such as journalist and researcher Jim Marrs, argue that his case was hampered by missing witnesses that Garrison had sought out. Among them were right-wing Cuban exile, Sergio Arcacha Smith, head of the CIA-backed, anti-Castro Cuban Democratic Revolutionary Front in New Orleans, a group that David Ferrie was reputedly "extremely active in", and a group that maintained an office in the same building as Guy Banister. According to Garrison, several witnesses fled New Orleans to states whose governors refused to honor Garrison's extradition requests. Sergio Arcacha Smith, however, had left New Orleans well before Garrison began his investigation, and said that he was willing to speak with Garrison's investigators if allowed to have legal representation present. Garrison attempted to get Smith extradited from Texas, but Texas Governor John Connally refused to sign the extradition warrant. Garrison also attempted to extradite Gordon Novel from Ohio, but this request was blocked by the Ohio governor. Garrison issued a subpoena to Allen Dulles, the former head of the CIA fired by Kennedy and a member of the Warren Commission, but the subpoena was quashed. Others subpoenaed by Garrison who he could not get to testify included Sandra Moffett, Warren DeBrueys, and Regis Kennedy.

Garrison produced six surprise witnesses who testified that they saw Oswald in the company of Ferrie and Shaw in Clinton, Louisiana in Autumn 1963. One of these witnesses was Corrie C. Collins, the head of the Clinton chapter of the Congress of Racial Equality, who testified that they saw the three men together. Another was the barber Edwin L. MacGehee who testified that he gave Oswald a haircut and that he told him that he was looking for a job. He added that he had referred Oswald to Reeves Morgan. Morgan was also called on to testify and said that he did meet Oswald and discuss job prospects with him. These witnesses have been deemed not credible by some researchers, including Gerald Posner and Patricia Lambert. When the House Select Committee on Assassinations released its Final Report in 1979, it stated that after interviewing the Clinton witnesses, it found the witnesses "credible and significant" and that "it was the judgment of the committee that they were telling the truth as they knew it."

In an attempt to prove a high-level government cover-up, Garrison focused on JFK's military autopsy at Bethesda Naval Hospital. Philadelphia attorney Vincent Salandria, an early Warren Commission critic who had written about the assassination's forensic evidence, helped prepare assistant district attorney Alvin Oser for his two-day cross-examination of JFK autopsy pathologist Pierre Finck. Oser was able to get Dr. Finck to admit on the witness stand that the autopsy was not controlled by chief pathologist Dr. James Humes but instead by unnamed Army generals and admirals in attendance, and that a general ordered the pathologists to end the procedure before the autopsy was completed.

Prior to the trial, Garrison overcame legal resistance from Time, Inc. and subpoenaed a relatively low-quality copy of the Zapruder film. The courtroom screenings of the 26-second film represented its first public viewing as a motion picture, and not as a series of printed frames. The jurors were said to have been "spellbound" by the film and asked to see it multiple times. The film was shown in conjunction with the questioning of Dr. John Nichols, a pathology professor, who testified, "I find that it [the Zapruder film] is compatible with the gunshot having been delivered from the front." The motion picture images of the fatal head shot knocking Kennedy backward and to his left visually proved, in Garrison's argument, that there was a second shooter positioned in front and to the right, thus corroborating the charge of conspiracy.

== Verdict and juror reaction ==
At the trial's conclusion, the jury took 54 minutes on March 1, 1969, to find Clay Shaw not guilty. Attorney and author Mark Lane said he interviewed several jurors after the trial. Although these interviews have never been published, Lane said that some of the jurors believed that Garrison had in fact proven to them there was a conspiracy to kill President Kennedy, but that Garrison had not adequately linked the conspiracy to Shaw or provided a motive. Garrison reiterated this view in 1988, writing: "While the jury accepted my argument that there had been a conspiracy, it was not then aware of Shaw's role as a clandestine C.I.A. operative. Unconvinced of his motivation, the jury acquitted him of the charges."

Author and playwright James Kirkwood, who was a personal friend of Clay Shaw, said that he spoke to several jury members who denied ever speaking to Lane. Kirkwood also cast doubt on the claim by Garrison and Lane that the jury believed there was a conspiracy. In his book American Grotesque, Kirkwood said that jury foreman Sidney Hebert told him: "I didn't think too much of the Warren Report either until the trial. Now I think a lot more of it than I did before."

== Later findings, and CIA revelations ==
On May 8, 1967, the New Orleans States-Item reported that Garrison charged that the CIA and FBI cooperated to conceal the facts of the assassination, and that he planned to seek a Senate inquiry looking into the CIA's role in the Warren Commission's investigation.

Garrison subsequently wrote a book, On the Trail of the Assassins, about his investigation of the JFK assassination and the Clay Shaw trial. The book was one of the main sources for Oliver Stone's movie JFK. In the movie, the trial serves as the back story for Stone's account of the assassination.

Jack Wardlaw, then of the since defunct New Orleans States-Item, and his fellow journalist Rosemary James, a native of South Carolina, co-authored Plot or Politics, a 1967 book which takes issue with the Garrison investigation as one of political style, rather than substantive evidence. Wardlaw also won an Associated Press award for his story on the death of David Ferrie.

In 1979, the House Select Committee on Assassinations (HSCA) stated that available records "lent substantial credence to the possibility that Oswald and David Ferrie had been involved in the same Civil Air Patrol (CAP) unit during the same period of time." Committee investigators found six witnesses who said that Oswald had been present at CAP meetings headed by David Ferrie.

In 1979, the HSCA wrote in its Final Report that the Committee was "inclined to believe that Oswald was in Clinton, Louisiana in late August, [or] early September 1963, and that he was in the company of David Ferrie, if not Clay Shaw," and that witnesses in Clinton, Louisiana "established an association of an undetermined nature between Ferrie, Shaw and Oswald less than three months before the assassination".

David Ferrie (second from left) with Lee Harvey Oswald (far right) in the New Orleans Civil Air Patrol in 1955. This photo showing Ferrie and Oswald together only became public after the trial was over.

In 1993, the PBS television program Frontline obtained a group photograph, taken eight years before the assassination, that showed Oswald and Ferrie at a cookout with other Civil Air Patrol cadets. Frontline executive producer Michael Sullivan said, "one should be cautious in ascribing its meaning. The photograph does give much support to the eyewitnesses who say they saw Ferrie and Oswald together in the CAP, and it makes Ferrie's denials that he ever knew Oswald less credible. But it does not prove that the two men were with each other in 1963, nor that they were involved in a conspiracy to kill the president."

In a 1992 interview, Edward Haggerty, who was the judge at the Clay Shaw trial, stated: "I believe he [Shaw] was lying to the jury. Of course, the jury probably believed him. But I think Shaw put a good con job on the jury."

In On the Trail of the Assassins, Garrison states that Shaw had an "extensive international role as an employee of the CIA." In the September 1969 issue of Penthouse, Shaw denied that he had had any connection with the CIA.

During a 1979 libel suit involving the book Coup D'Etat In America, Richard Helms, former director of the CIA, testified under oath that Shaw had been a part-time contact of the Domestic Contact Service of the CIA, where Shaw volunteered information from his travels abroad, mostly to Latin America. Like Shaw, 150,000 Americans (businessmen, and journalists, etc.) had provided such information to the DCS by the mid-1970s. (Note: The United States House Select Committee on Assassinations noted that "25,000 Americans annually provided information to the CIA's Domestic Contacts Division on a nonclandestine basis" and that "such acts of cooperation should not be confused with an actual Agency relationship.") In February 2003, the CIA released documents pertaining to an earlier inquiry from the Assassination Records Review Board about QKENCHANT, a CIA "project used to provide security approvals on non-Agency personnel", that indicated "Clay Shaw received an initial 'five agency' clearance on 23 March 1949", and that "Shaw in all probability was not cleared by the QKENCHANT program."

Garrison's successor as District Attorney, Harry Connick Sr., in 1995 promised to the Assassination Records Review Board and at a public meeting in New Orleans that he would donate the Garrison investigative files, which were still in his office. According to the review board's final report, Connick instructed one of his investigators, Gary Raymond, to destroy these documents after he took office. Raymond took them home instead and kept them because he did not feel right about burning the records, stating, "It's not every day you are assigned to burn the records of investigations into the assassination of a president." When he found out about the review board in 1995, he gave the records to television reporter Richard Angelico for Angelico to deliver the records to Congress, stating, "When Congress asks for all documents, they mean all documents." A battle ensued between Connick and the Review Board after Connick demanded that the papers were returned to him and threatening to withhold the investigation papers. After many subpoenas going both ways, and with the help of the U.S. Department of Justice, the Review Board won and all of the documents in question are in the JFK Collection.

== Reaction ==
According to The New York Times, the trial of Clay Shaw was "widely described as a circus". Jerry Cohen of the Los Angeles Times said it was "a lengthy comic-opera trial devoid of evidence against the man accused". Burt A. Folkart, also of the Los Angeles Times, called it "a farcical trial". Leading up to the trial, Hugh Aynesworth of Newsweek wrote: "If only no one were living through it—and standing trial for it—the case against Shaw would be a merry kind of parody of conspiracy theories, a can-you-top-this of arbitrarily conjoined improbabilities."
