= Clay Shaw =

American businessman acquitted of involvement in JFK assassination (1913–1974)

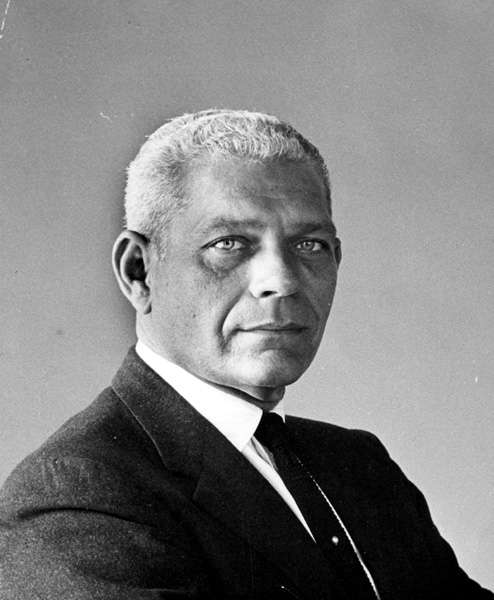
- Born: Clay LaVergne Shaw; March 17, 1913; Kentwood, Louisiana, U.S.
- Died: August 15, 1974 (aged 61); New Orleans, Louisiana, U.S.
- Education: Warren Easton High School
- Occupations: Businessman and director of the International Trade Mart in New Orleans
- Military career
- Branch: United States Army
- Service years: 1941–1946
- Rank: Major
- Conflicts: World War II

Clay LaVergne Shaw (March 17, 1913 – August 15, 1974) was an American businessman, military officer, and part-time contact of the Domestic Contact Service (DCS) of the CIA. Shaw is best known for being the only person brought to trial (Note: The prime suspect in Kennedy's assassination, Lee Harvey Oswald, was killed by Jack Ruby before he could stand trial.) for involvement in the 1963 assassination of John F. Kennedy, due to an investigation led by Jim Garrison, the District Attorney of New Orleans. The jury ultimately acquitted Shaw after less than an hour's deliberation in 1969, though some conspiracy theorists continue to speculate on his possible involvement.

== Background ==
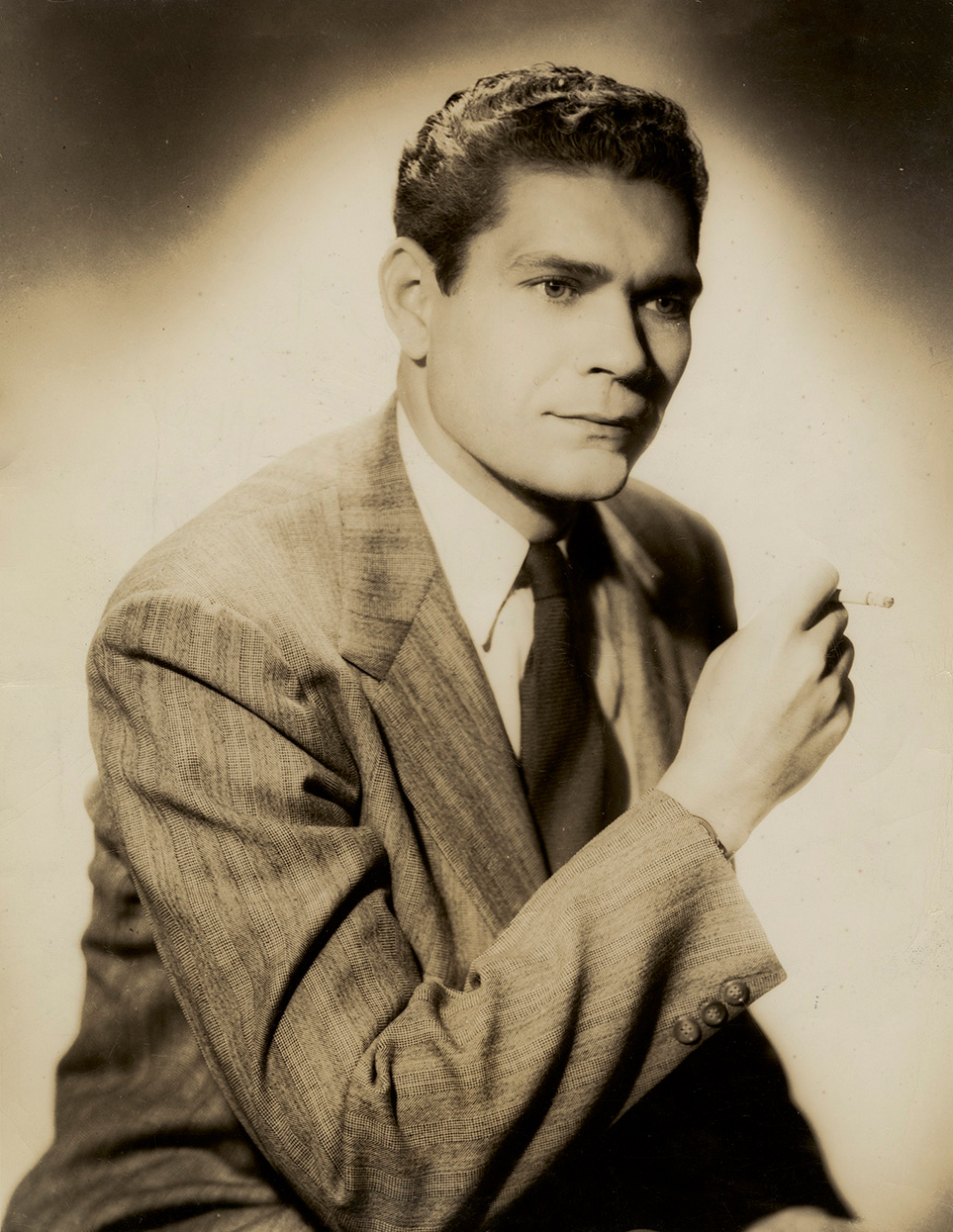

Shaw, a native of Kentwood, Louisiana, was the son of Glaris Lenora Shaw, a United States Marshal, and Alice Shaw. His grandfather had been the sheriff of Tangipahoa Parish. When Shaw was five, his family moved to New Orleans, where he eventually attended Warren Easton High School.

After graduating from high school in 1928, Shaw was hired by Western Union as manager of a local office in New Orleans. In 1935, Western Union transferred him to New York City where he became a district manager. While in New York, Shaw, who wanted to pursue a career as a writer, attended Columbia University. He later left Western Union to pursue a career in public relations, eventually accepting a position with the Keedick Lecture Bureau.

Shaw enlisted in the United States Army upon the American entry into World War II and was assigned to the Medical Corps as a private. He later received an officer's commission and was posted to England where he served briefly in a hospital unit. He was transferred to the Quartermaster Corps and served as secretary to the General Staff in England and after the Normandy invasion served in France and Belgium. He was decorated by three nations: the United States with the Legion of Merit and Bronze Star, by France with the Croix de Guerre and named Chevalier de l'Ordre du Merite, and by Belgium named Knight of the Order of the Crown of Belgium. Shaw was honorably discharged from the United States Army as a major in 1946.

After World War II, Shaw helped start the International Trade Mart in New Orleans, which facilitated the sales of both domestic and imported goods. He was known locally for his efforts to preserve buildings in New Orleans' historic French Quarter. Today Shaw's renovation and preservation efforts are commemorated by a plaque in tribute to him located at 724 Governor Nicholls Street in the French Quarter. Shaw was also a published playwright. The best-known of his works, Submerged (1929), was co-written with H. Stuart Cottman when both were still high-school students.

From 1947 he was a friend of Holland McCombs of Time magazine. Shaw represented the United States on the board of directors for Permindex, a Swiss trade organization.

On May 9, 1961, Shaw introduced Charles Cabell, Deputy Director of the CIA, at a Foreign Policy Association event in New Orleans.

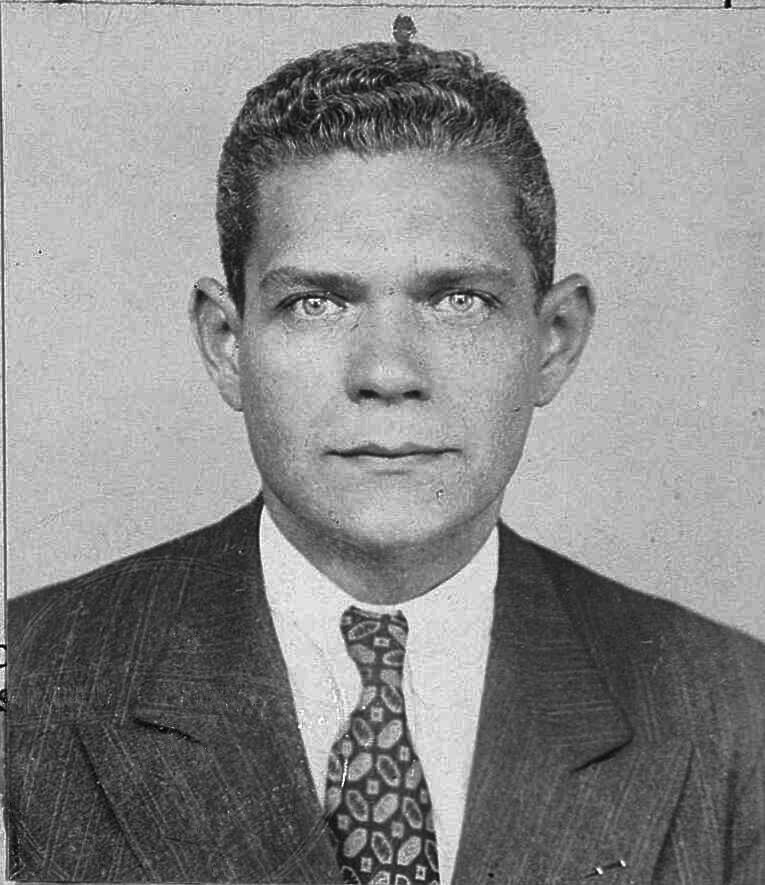
Shaw in 1951, on his Brazilian immigration card

== Arrest and trial ==
New Orleans District Attorney Jim Garrison prosecuted Shaw on the charge that he and a group of activists, including David Ferrie and Guy Banister, were involved in a conspiracy with elements of the CIA and the Mafia in the John F. Kennedy assassination. Garrison had Shaw arrested on March 1, 1967. By the time of Shaw's arrest, Banister and Ferrie were both deceased but Garrison believed Shaw was the man named "Clay Bertrand" who was identified in the Warren Commission Report as having asked attorney Dean Andrews, via telephone, to represent accused presidential assassin Lee Harvey Oswald. Garrison also claimed Shaw used the alias of Clay Bertrand in New Orleans's gay society.

During the trial, which took place in January and February 1969, Garrison called insurance salesman Perry Russo as his main witness. Russo testified that he had attended a party at the apartment of anti-Castro activist David Ferrie. At the party, Russo said that Lee Harvey Oswald (who Russo said was introduced to him as "Leon Oswald"), Ferrie, and "Clem Bertrand" (whom Russo identified in the courtroom as Shaw) had discussed assassinating Kennedy. The conversation purportedly included plans for the "triangulation of crossfire" and alibis for the participants.

Critics of Garrison argue that his own records indicate Russo's story evolved substantially over time, undermining Russo's creditability. A key source was the "Sciambra Memo", which recorded Assistant D.A. Andrew Sciambra's first interview with Russo. The memo does not mention an "assassination party" and states that Russo met with Shaw on two occasions, neither of which occurred at the party. On February 25, 1969, Andrews testified during Shaw's trial that the name "'Clay Bertrand' was a figment of [his] imagination.

On March 1, 1969, the 34-day trial concluded when the jury acquitted Shaw after deliberating less than an hour.

Shaw denied any part of a conspiracy and said of the slain President: "I was a great admirer of Kennedy. I thought he had given the nation a new turn after the rather drab Eisenhower years ... I felt he was vitally concerned about social issues, which concerned me also. I thought he had youth, imagination, style, and élan. All in all, I considered him a splendid president."

== Death ==
Shaw died at the age of 61 at his home on August 15, 1974. He was a heavy cigarette smoker for most of his life, and the cause of death was listed as metastatic lung cancer. A memorial service eulogy was delivered by his long-time friend, the poet Rod McKuen. He was buried in Woodland Cemetery in Kentwood, Louisiana.

At the time of his death, Shaw was engaged in a $5 million lawsuit against Garrison and members of an organization, Truth and Consequences Inc., that had financed Garrison's investigation. As Shaw, a lifelong bachelor, had no heirs or surviving relatives who might stand to benefit from the lawsuit, the United States Supreme Court dismissed the suit in 1978.

== Later disclosures ==
In 1979, Richard Helms, former Director of the CIA, testified under oath that Shaw had been a part-time contact of the Domestic Contact Service (DCS) of the CIA, where Shaw volunteered information from his travels abroad, mostly to Latin America. He did so from 1948 till at least 1956. Shaw was one of approximately 150,000 Americans (including businessmen and journalists) who had provided such information to the DCS by the mid-1970s "on a nonclandestine basis", and that "such acts of cooperation should not be confused with an actual Agency relationship".

== In popular culture ==
Tommy Lee Jones portrayed Shaw in Oliver Stone's 1991 film JFK. He was nominated for the Academy Award for Best Supporting Actor for the role.
