= Jon Margolis =

Jon Margolis (1940–2024) was an American journalist and author.

== Biography ==
Margolis was born in Trenton, New Jersey in 1940. He attended Rutgers Preparatory School and graduated from Oberlin College, with a degree in history in 1962.

After college, Margolis worked for the Bergen Record in Hackensack, New Jersey. He went on to work for the Miami Herald, the Concord Monitor, and Newsday. He was the Washington correspondent for the Chicago Tribune from 1973 to 1995.

In 1995, Margolis moved to the Northeast Kingdom of Vermont. He did freelance work and then founded his own news website. From 2010 to 2020, he was a political columnist for VTDigger.

In 1999, Margolis published the book The Last Innocent Year: America in 1964--The Beginning of the "Sixties".

== Books ==
- The Last Innocent Year: America in 1964 (1999)
- The Quotable Bob Dole: Witty, Wise and Otherwise (1996)
- How to Fool Fish With Feathers (1992)
