= Jim Garrison =

American district attorney (1921–1992)

- 1968 photograph of Garrison

District Attorney of Orleans Parish
- In office 1962–1973
- Preceded by: Richard Dowling
- Succeeded by: Harry Connick Sr.
- Constituency: New Orleans, Louisiana, U.S.

Personal details
- Born: Earling Carothers Garrison; November 20, 1921 Denison, Iowa, U.S.
- Died: October 21, 1992 (aged 70) New Orleans, Louisiana, U.S.
- Party: Democratic
- Spouse: Leah Elizabeth Ziegler (m. 1958)
- Children: 5
- Education: Tulane University (LLB)
- Known for: Trial of Clay Shaw

James Carothers Garrison (born Earling Carothers Garrison; November 20, 1921 – October 21, 1992) was the District Attorney of Orleans Parish, Louisiana, from 1962 to 1973 and later a state appellate court judge. A member of the Democratic Party, he is best known for his investigations into the assassination of John F. Kennedy and the prosecution of New Orleans businessman Clay Shaw to that effect in 1969, which ended in Shaw's acquittal. Garrison believed the assassination was the result of a conspiracy involving the CIA, FBI, The Pentagon (United States Department of Defense), the Mafia and other organizations. He wrote three published books, one of which became a prime source for Oliver Stone's film JFK in 1991, in which Garrison was portrayed by Kevin Costner, while Garrison himself made a cameo appearance as Earl Warren.

== Early life and career ==
Garrison was born in Denison, Iowa, in 1921. He was the first child and only son of Earling R. Garrison and Jane Anne Robinson, who divorced before his sixth birthday. His mother moved Jim and his sister from Iowa to New Orleans. He attended Alcée Fortier High School, class of 1939. He served in the U.S. Army Air Forces in France and Germany during World War II, having enlisted a year before the Japanese attack on Pearl Harbor. Among Garrison's duties was to fly very low-altitude surveillance planes, nicknamed "grasshoppers". The dangerous flights were meant to spot artillery targets and had high fatality rates. His artillery unit was one of the first to arrive for the liberation of the Dachau concentration camp.

After the war, he attended Tulane University Law School, graduating with a Bachelor of Laws degree in 1949. He later went back for a Master of Civil Laws degree. After working briefly for the prestigious New Orleans law firm of Deutsch, Kerrigan & Stiles, he opted to join the Federal Bureau of Investigation (FBI) in the Pacific Northwest, where he was stationed in the Seattle and Tacoma offices.

In the prelude to the Korean War, Garrison enlisted in the National Guard, and then applied in 1951 for active Army duty. However, because of his recurring nightmares of past missions, he was dismissed by the Army in October 1951. Remaining in the Guard—when it became apparent he suffered from what was then called "battle fatigue" due to his numerous high-risk grasshopper flights in WWII—led one Army doctor to conclude that Garrison had a "severe and disabling psychoneurosis" which "interfered with his social and professional adjustment to a marked degree. He was considered totally incapacitated from the standpoint of military duty and moderately incapacitated in civilian adaptability." Yet, when his record was reviewed further by the U.S. Army Surgeon General, he "found him to be physically qualified for federal recognition in the national army."

== District attorney ==
Upon returning again to civilian life, Garrison worked in several different trial lawyer positions before being appointed as an assistant district attorney in New Orleans. He served in that role from 1955 to early 1958, and developed a reputation as a flamboyant, colorful figure in the city. He made his first run for public office in 1958, losing the election for City Assessor. In 1960, he lost another race, this time for a Criminal Court Judge seat, but by then he had been appointed Assistant City Attorney, a part-time job paying a nominal salary. From the City Attorney's office, he had a close view of the incumbent District Attorney Richard Dowling and did not approve of the latter's conduct. In 1961, Garrison entered the race for New Orleans DA. In the five-man Democratic primary, he came in a surprise second place to Dowling. Garrison benefitted from what was considered a strong performance in a televised debate. In the runoff election, Garrison scored an upset win by 6,000 votes. Handicapped by a lack of major political backing, he had saved his meager campaign funds for an effective TV advertising blitz against Dowling in the final weeks.

Once in office, Garrison cracked down on prostitution and the abuses of Bourbon Street bars and strip joints. He indicted Dowling and one of his assistants for criminal malfeasance, but the charges were dismissed for lack of evidence. Garrison did not appeal the decision. He received national attention for a series of vice raids in the French Quarter, staged sometimes on a nightly basis. Newspaper headlines in 1962 praised his efforts, "Quarter Crime Emergency Declared by Police, DA. – Garrison Back, Vows Vice Drive to Continue – 14 Arrested, 12 more nabbed in Vice Raids." Garrison's critics often point out that many of the arrests made by his office did not result in convictions, implying that he was in the habit of making arrests without evidence; however, assistant DA William Alford said that charges would, more often than not, be reduced or dropped if a relative of someone charged gained Garrison's ear. Alford said Garrison had "a heart of gold".

After a conflict with local criminal judges over his budget, Garrison accused them of racketeering and conspiring against him. The eight judges charged him with misdemeanor criminal defamation, and Garrison was convicted in January 1963. In 1964, the U.S. Supreme Court overturned the conviction and struck down the state statute as unconstitutional. At the same time, Garrison indicted Judge Bernard Cocke with criminal malfeasance and, in two trials prosecuted by Garrison himself, Cocke was acquitted. Garrison charged nine policemen with brutality, but dropped the charges two weeks later. At a press conference, he accused the state parole board of accepting bribes, but could obtain no indictments. Critical of the state legislature, Garrison was unanimously censured by it for "deliberately maligning all of the members". In 1965, running for reelection against Judge Malcolm O'Hara, Garrison won with 60 percent of the vote.

=== Kennedy assassination investigation ===
As New Orleans D.A., in late 1966, Garrison began an investigation into the assassination of President John F. Kennedy, after receiving several tips from Jack Martin that a man named David Ferrie may have been involved in the assassination. The result of Garrison's investigation was the arrest and trial of New Orleans businessman Clay Shaw in 1969, with Shaw being unanimously acquitted less than one hour after the case went to the jury. Garrison was able to subpoena the Zapruder film from Life magazine. Thus, members of the American public – i.e., the jurors of the case – were shown the movie for the first time. Until the trial, the film rarely had been seen, and copies were made by assassination investigator Steve Jaffe, who was working with Garrison's office. In 2015, Garrison's lead investigator's daughter released his copy of the film, along with a number of his personal papers from the investigation.

Garrison's key witness against Shaw was Perry Russo, a 25-year-old insurance salesman from Baton Rouge, Louisiana. At the trial, Russo testified that he had attended a party at anti-Castro activist David Ferrie's apartment. At the party, Russo said that Lee Harvey Oswald (whom Russo said was introduced to him as "Leon Oswald"), David Ferrie, and "Clem Bertrand" (whom Russo identified in the courtroom as Clay Shaw) had discussed killing President Kennedy. The conversation included plans for the "triangulation of crossfire" and alibis for the participants.

Russo's version of events has been questioned by some historians and researchers, such as Patricia Lambert, once it became known that part of his testimony might have been induced by hypnosis and by the drug sodium pentothal (sometimes called "truth serum"). An early version of Russo's testimony (as told in Assistant D.A. Andrew Sciambra's memo, before Russo was subjected to sodium pentothal and hypnosis) fails to mention an "assassination party" and says that Russo met Shaw on two occasions, neither of which occurred at the party. However, in his book On the Trail of the Assassins, Garrison says that Russo had already discussed the party at Ferrie's apartment before any "truth serum" was administered. Sciambra said that the party information was simply accidentally left off the notes of his encounter with Russo. Throughout his life, Russo reiterated the same account of being present for a party at Ferrie's house along with Mr. Bertrand, where the subject of Kennedy's potential assassination had come up. Garrison defended his conduct regarding witness testimony, stating:

Before we introduced the testimony of our witnesses, we made them undergo independent verifying tests, including polygraph examination, truth serum and hypnosis. We thought this would be hailed as an unprecedented step in jurisprudence; instead, the press turned around and hinted that we had drugged our witnesses or given them posthypnotic suggestions to testify falsely.

In May 1967 Garrison appeared on ABC's Issues and Answers program to discuss his investigation. Later in July Garrison was granted 30 minutes by NBC to respond to their program criticizing his investigation. He used his time to dismiss the Warren Report as a "fairy tale" and charged that "President Kennedy was assassinated by men who sought to obtain a radical change in our foreign policy, particularly in regard to Cuba".

In January 1968, Garrison subpoenaed Kerry Wendell Thornley – an acquaintance of Oswald's from their days in the military – to appear before a grand jury, questioning him about his relationship with Oswald and his knowledge of other figures that Garrison believed were connected to the assassination. Thornley sought a cancellation of this subpoena on which he had to appear before the Circuit Court. Garrison charged Thornley with perjury after Thornley denied that he had been in contact with Oswald in any manner since 1959. The perjury charge was eventually dropped by Garrison's successor, Harry Connick Sr. Also in 1968, Mort Sahl used his connection to get Garrison a spot on The Tonight Show Starring Johnny Carson to discuss the assassination.

During Garrison's 1973 bribery trial, tape recordings from March 1971 revealed that Garrison considered implicating publicly the former United States Air Force General and Deputy Director of the Central Intelligence Agency, Charles Cabell, of conspiracy in the assassination of Kennedy after learning that he was the brother of Earle Cabell, the Dallas mayor in 1963. Theorizing that a plot to kill the president was masterminded out of New Orleans in conjunction with the CIA, with cooperation from the Dallas police department and city government, Garrison allegedly tasked his former chief investigator, Pershing Gervais, to look into the possibility that General Cabell had stayed in the city's Fontainebleau Motel at the time of the assassination. The Washington Post reported that there was no evidence that Gervais ever followed through with the request and that there was no further mention of General Cabell in Garrison's investigation. The article also noted that, by the date in question, Gervais was no longer working for the district attorney in New Orleans.

A U.S. talk-radio host, David Mendelsohn, conducted a comprehensive interview with Garrison that was broadcast in 1988 by KPFA in Berkeley, California. Alongside Garrison, the program featured the voices of Lee Harvey Oswald and JFK filmmaker Oliver Stone. Garrison explained that cover stories were circulated in an attempt to blame the killing on the Cubans and the Mafia, but that he blames the conspiracy to kill President Kennedy firmly on the CIA, which wanted to continue the Cold War. The very same reasonings as to why he thought that President Kennedy was killed were espoused by Garrison in filmed television appearances that he would make leading up to his death, the year after Stone's release of his cinematic film JFK, largely based on Garrison's pioneering role in the lone prosecution in the case of President Kennedy's assassination.

== Later career and death ==
In 1973, Garrison was tried and found not guilty by the jury for accepting bribes to protect illegal pinball machine operations. In an interview with Pershing Gervais conducted by New Orleans reporter Rosemary James, Gervais had admitted to concocting the charges. In the same year, Garrison was defeated for reelection as district attorney by Harry Connick Sr. On April 15, 1978, Garrison won a special election over a Republican candidate, Thomas F. Jordan, for Louisiana's 4th Circuit Court of Appeal judgeship, a position for which he was later reelected and which he held until his death.

In 1987, Garrison appeared in the film The Big Easy where he essentially played himself, and the next year he was featured in The Men Who Killed Kennedy series, airing in the United States beginning in 1988. After the Shaw trial, Garrison wrote three books on the Kennedy assassination: A Heritage of Stone (1970), The Star Spangled Contract (1976, fiction but based on the JFK assassination), and his best-seller, On the Trail of the Assassins (1988). A Heritage of Stone, published by Putnam, places responsibility for the assassination on the CIA and claims the Warren Commission, the Executive Branch, members of the Dallas Police Department, the pathologists at Bethesda, and various others lied to the American public. The book mentions neither Shaw by name nor Garrison's investigation of him.

Garrison's investigation received widespread attention through Oliver Stone's film, JFK (1991), which was largely based on Garrison's book as well as Jim Marrs' Crossfire: The Plot That Killed Kennedy. Kevin Costner played a fictionalized version of Garrison in the movie. Garrison himself had a small on-screen role in the film, playing United States Supreme Court Chief Justice Earl Warren in two scenes; one interrogating Jack Ruby in prison with the commission, and one facing the press disputing Garrison's (Costner) theory of a conspiracy in favour of the lone-gunman theory on the steps of the Supreme Court. Garrison also appears live and comments on the Shaw Trial in the documentary The JFK Assassination: The Jim Garrison Tapes, written and directed by actor John Barbour. He was interviewed for the 1992 documentary film Beyond 'JFK': The Question of Conspiracy.

Having been bedridden for some time with heart disease, Garrison died in 1992 and is survived by his five children. He is interred at Metairie Cemetery in New Orleans.

== Legacy ==
Garrison's investigation and trial of Shaw has been described by critics as "a fatally flawed case built on flimsy evidence that featured a chorus of dubious and even wacky witnesses". Political commentator George Will wrote that Garrison "staged an assassination 'investigation' that involved recklessness, cruelty, abuse of power, publicity mongering and dishonesty, all on a scale that strongly suggested lunacy leavened by cynicism." Former Orleans Parish district attorney Harry Connick Sr., Garrison's elected successor, said it was "a travesty of justice", and that he "thought it was one of the grossest, most extreme miscarriages of justice in the annals of American judicial history." Journalist Max Holland also described the investigation of Shaw as an "egregious miscarriage of justice".

Others who have called Garrison's case against Shaw a "miscarriage of justice" or "travesty of justice" include historian Alecia Long, as well as journalist Gerald Posner. Conspiracy researcher Harold Weisberg called it a "tragedy". Political analyst and conspiracy believer Carl Oglesby was quoted as saying to "have done a study of Garrison: I come out of it thinking that he is one of the really first-rate class-act heroes of this whole ugly story [the killing of John F. Kennedy and subsequent investigation]." Conspiracy author David Lifton called Garrison "intellectually dishonest, a reckless prosecutor, and a total charlatan". At the time, Garrison came under criticism from author and researcher Sylvia Meagher, who in 1967 wrote that "as the Garrison investigation continued to unfold, it gave cause for increasingly serious misgivings about the validity of his evidence, the credibility of his witnesses, and the scrupulousness of his methods." According to Shaw's defense team, witnesses, including Russo, claimed to have been bribed and threatened with perjury and contempt of court charges by Garrison in order to make his case against Shaw.

== Filmography ==
Year	Title	Role	Notes
1986	The Big Easy	Judge	
1991	JFK	Judge Earl Warren	(final film role)

== Selected bibliography ==
=== Books ===
- A Heritage of Stone. Putnam Publishing Group (1970) ISBN 978-0399103988.
- The Star Spangled Contract. New York: McGraw-Hill (1976). ISBN 978-0070228900. OCLC 1992214.
- On the Trail of the Assassins. New York: Sheridan Square (1988). ISBN 978-0446362771.

=== Articles ===
- "The Murder Talents of the CIA". Freedom (April/May 1987)
