= David Ferrie =

American accused of involvement in JFK assassination (1918–1967)

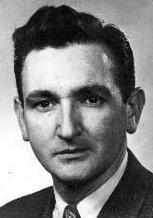
- Ferrie in 1950
- Born: David William Ferrie; March 28, 1918; Cleveland, Ohio, U.S.
- Died: February 22, 1967 (aged 48); New Orleans, Louisiana, U.S.
- Resting place: Saint Bernard Memorial Gardens
- Education: St. Mary's Seminary; Baldwin-Wallace College
- Occupation: Pilot
- Known for: Allegations made by Jim Garrison during the investigation of the John F. Kennedy assassination

David William Ferrie (March 28, 1918 – February 22, 1967) was an American pilot and anti-communist activist who was alleged by New Orleans District Attorney Jim Garrison to have been involved in a conspiracy to assassinate President John F. Kennedy. Ferrie denied any involvement in a conspiracy and said he never knew Oswald. Decades later, photos emerged establishing that Ferrie had been in the same Civil Air Patrol unit as Oswald in the 1950s.

== Early life ==
Ferrie was born in Cleveland, Ohio. A Roman Catholic, he attended St. Ignatius High School. In 1938, shortly before obtaining his B.A. from John Carroll University, he decided to enter the priesthood and enrolled at St. Mary's Seminary, but he was dismissed from the seminary in 1940. He then went to Baldwin-Wallace College and completed his B.A. in philosophy in 1941. By this time, he was suffering from alopecia areata, a rare disease that causes loss of body hair, and the severity of the condition may worsen with age. Later in life, to compensate for his hair loss, Ferrie wore a homemade auburn wig and false eyebrows attached with glue.

In 1941, he entered St. Charles Seminary but left there in 1944 because of "emotional instability." He obtained a pilot's license and began teaching aeronautics at Cleveland's Benedictine High School. He was fired from the school for several infractions, including taking boys to a house of prostitution. He then became an insurance inspector and, in 1951, moved to New Orleans where he worked as a pilot for Eastern Air Lines, until losing his job in August 1961, after being arrested twice on morals charges.

Ferrie was involved with the Civil Air Patrol in several ways: He started as a Senior Member (an adult member) with the Fifth Cleveland Squadron at Hopkins Airport in 1947. When he moved to New Orleans, he transferred to the New Orleans Cadet Squadron at Lakefront Airport. There he served as an instructor, and later as the Commander. After a Ferrie-trained cadet pilot perished in a December 1954 crash, Ferrie's annual re-appointment was declined. He was asked to be a guest aerospace education instructor at a smaller squadron at Moisant Airport, and lectured there from June to September 1955. On July 27, 1955, 15-year-old Lee Harvey Oswald joined this squadron. In 1957 he received a doctorate degree in psychology, through a correspondence course, from the unaccredited Phoenix University in Bari, Italy. Ferrie also developed an interest in research chemistry and hypnosis.

In March 1958, a former cadet-turned-commander invited Ferrie back to the New Orleans Cadet Squadron. Ferrie served unofficially for a time and was reinstated as Executive Officer in September 1959. Ferrie quit the squadron in June 1960 after a disagreement during a bivouac. In September 1960, he started his own unofficial squadron, called the Metairie Falcon Cadet Squadron. An offshoot of this group was the Internal Mobile Security Unit, a group formed for the fight against Fidel Castro's Cuba. Over the years, he used both his official and unofficial squadrons to develop improper relations with boys ranging in age from 14 to 18, and his August 1961 arrests caused the Falcons to fold.

Ferrie described himself as a liberal on civil rights issues, and he was "rabidly anti-Communist", often accusing previous U.S. presidential administrations of being "sell-outs" to Communism. Ferrie initially supported Castro's campaign against Fulgencio Batista in Cuba, but by mid-1959 became convinced that Castro was a Communist. According to the United States House Select Committee on Assassinations, Ferrie "found an outlet for his political fanaticism in the anti-Castro movement." By early 1961, Ferrie was working with right-wing Cuban exile Sergio Arcacha Smith, head of the Central Intelligence Agency-backed Cuban Democratic Revolutionary Front in New Orleans. In a newspaper interview in July, 1961, Ferrie explained why he was volunteering for the organization. "I got interested after our botched-up Cuban invasion of April 17," he said, referring to the Bay of Pigs Invasion. Ferrie soon became Arcacha Smith's "eager partner in counterrevolutionary activities." Both were involved in a raid in late 1961 on a munitions depot in Houma, Louisiana, "in which various weapons, grenades and ammunition were stolen."

Ferrie often spoke to business and civic groups on political issues. In July 1961, Ferrie gave an anti-Kennedy speech before the New Orleans chapter of the Military Order of the World Wars, in which "his topic was the Presidential administration and the Bay of Pigs Invasion fiasco." In his speech, Ferrie attacked Kennedy for refusing to provide air support to the Bay of Pigs invasion force of Cuban exiles. Ferrie's tirade against Kennedy was so poorly received that he was asked to leave the podium. Ferrie admitted to the Federal Bureau of Investigation, after the assassination, that when speaking about Kennedy, he might have used the expression: "He ought to be shot." Ferrie insisted, however, that these words were just "an off-hand or colloquial expression."

In the early 1960s, Ferrie became involved with Guy Banister, former Special Agent In Charge (SAC) of the Chicago office of the FBI, right-wing political activist, segregationist, and private investigator. Banister also worked with Ferrie's associate, Sergio Arcacha Smith. In early 1962, both Banister and Arcacha Smith maintained offices in the Newman Building at the corner address of 544 Camp Street / 531 Lafayette Street, New Orleans, the same address printed on Lee Harvey Oswald's distributed pro-Castro pamphlets.

In February 1962, Banister assisted Ferrie in his dispute with Eastern Airlines regarding "charges brought [against Ferrie] by the airline and local New Orleans police of crimes against nature and extortion." During this period, Ferrie was often seen at Banister's office. Banister testified to Ferrie's "good character" at an airline pilot's grievance board hearing in the summer of 1963.

Ferrie and Banister also worked together in the fall of 1963 for lawyer G. Wray Gill, on behalf of Gill's client, New Orleans Mafia boss Carlos Marcello, in an attempt to block Marcello's deportation to Guatemala. He made trips to Guatemala on Marcello's behalf and visited the mobster at his farm. He was also present in court on the day of Marcello's acquittal. According to John Diuguid of the Justice Department, when he travelled to Guatemala to investigate the legitimacy of Marcello's fraudulent Guatemalan birth certificate, he was followed there by Ferrie who kept a watch on him. On a related matter, the House Select Committee on Assassinations stated that "An unconfirmed Border Patrol report of February 1962 alleges that Ferrie was the pilot who flew Carlos Marcello back into the United States from Guatemala after he had been deported in April 1961 as part of U.S. Attorney General Robert F. Kennedy's crackdown on organized crime." Another report, this one by the FBI, "indicated Marcello offered [Ferrie associate Sergio] Arcacha Smith a deal whereby Marcello would make a substantial donation to the [anti-Castro] movement in return for concessions in Cuba after Castro's overthrow."

== Allegations of involvement in the Kennedy assassination ==
The FBI and Secret Service were interested in Ferrie as early as November 25, 1963, just three days after the Kennedy assassination. He and two other men were arrested and booked for vagrancy by the New Orleans district attorney's office; they were "held for investigation by the Federal Bureau of Investigation and the Secret Service". They were released the next day. First Assistant District Attorney Frank Klein, who questioned Ferrie with investigators, said he could not comment on the case. It was later reported that Ferrie was "intensely interrogated by the district attorney's office in 1963 after the assassination" and "talked also to the FBI and the Secret Service."

On the afternoon of November 22, 1963 – the day John F. Kennedy was assassinated and the day Carlos Marcello was acquitted in his deportation case – New Orleans private investigator Guy Banister and one of his employees, Jack Martin, were drinking together at a local bar. On their return to Banister's office, the two men got into a heated argument. According to Martin, Banister said something to which Martin replied, "What are you going to do – kill me like you all did Kennedy?" Banister drew his .357 magnum revolver and pistol-whipped Martin several times. Martin, badly injured, went by ambulance to Charity Hospital.

In the ensuing days, Martin told reporters and authorities that Ferrie might have been involved in the assassination. Martin told the New Orleans police that Ferrie "was supposed to have been the getaway pilot in the assassination." He said that Ferrie had threatened Kennedy's life, even outlining plans to kill him, and that Ferrie might have taught Oswald how to use a rifle with a telescopic sight. Martin also claimed that Ferrie had known Oswald from their days in the New Orleans Civil Air Patrol, and that he had seen a photograph, at Ferrie's home, of Oswald in a Civil Air Patrol group.

Martin also told bail bondsman Hardy Davis that he had heard on television that Ferrie's New Orleans library card had been found in Oswald's possession when he was arrested in Dallas. Davis reported this to Ferrie's employer, the lawyer G. Wray Gill. In fact, no such library card was found among Oswald's possessions. Ferrie subsequently visited both Oswald's former New Orleans landlady and a former neighbor about this report. Ferrie was able to produce his library card for FBI agents who interviewed him on November 27, 1963.

Martin also claimed that Ferrie had driven from New Orleans to Texas on the night of the assassination. Ferrie gave various accounts of his trip to Texas. When questioned by the FBI, Ferrie stated that he and two friends drove 350 miles (560 km) to the Winterland Skating Rink in Houston, about 240 miles (390 km) from Dallas, that evening. Ferrie said that "he had been considering for some time the feasibility and possibility of opening an ice skating rink in New Orleans" and wanted to gather information on the ice rink business. "He stated that he introduced himself to [rink manager] Chuck Rolland and spoke with him at length concerning the cost of installation and operation of the rink." Another explanation for the trip appeared in a 1967 newspaper article, in which Ferrie said he and two friends went to Texas "for relaxation after he had completed a job of investigative work for a local attorney on a federal case." In another newspaper, Ferrie describes the trip as a "spur-of-the-moment" decision by him and two friends at about 3:20 p.m. Nov. 22, 1963: "We drove by car to Vinton, La., then to Houston and Galveston, where we hunted geese."

On November 25, Martin was contacted by the FBI. Martin told the FBI that Ferrie might have hypnotized Oswald into assassinating Kennedy. The FBI considered Martin's evidence unreliable. Nevertheless, FBI agents interviewed Ferrie twice about Martin's allegations. Ferrie admitted that he had made public and private statements criticizing Kennedy's actions during the Bay of Pigs, but he denied ever stating that the President should be killed. He stated that he had no recollection of having met Oswald and if he had the meeting would have been "very casual". Ferrie stated that Martin had "bedeviled him in every manner possible" since sending him out of Gill's office in an "undiplomatic manner" in June 1963. Gill told the FBI that Martin blamed Ferrie for not getting a job and subsequently "slandered Ferrie at every opportunity". The FBI also interviewed about 20 other people in connection with Martin's allegations. The FBI said that it was unable to develop a substantial case against Ferrie. An inquiry by the House Select Committee on Assassinations, conducted a decade and a half later, concluded that the FBI's "overall investigation of the 544 Camp Street issue at the time of the assassination was not thorough."

After learning of the allegations, Ferrie contacted several of his former Civil Air Patrol associates for more information about Oswald. Former cadet Roy McCoy told the FBI that "Ferrie had come by looking for photographs of the cadets to see if Oswald was pictured in any photos of Ferrie's squadron." Some of this information reached Jim Garrison, the district attorney of New Orleans, who had become increasingly interested in the assassination after a chance meeting with Louisiana Senator Russell Long in late 1966. Garrison said that Long told him: "Those fellows on the Warren Commission were dead wrong. There's no way in the world that one man could have shot up Jack Kennedy that way."

In December 1966, Garrison interviewed Martin. Martin claimed that during the summer of 1963, Ferrie, Banister, Oswald, and a group of anti-Castro Cuban exiles were involved in operations against Castro's Cuba that included gun running activities and burglarizing armories. Garrison later wrote: "The Banister apparatus ... was part of a supply line that ran along the Dallas–New Orleans–Miami corridor. These supplies consisted of arms and explosives for use against Castro's Cuba."

As Garrison continued his investigation, he became convinced that a group of right-wing extremists, including Ferrie, Banister, and Clay Shaw, were involved in a conspiracy with elements of the CIA to kill Kennedy. Garrison later claimed that the motive for the assassination was anger over Kennedy's attempts to obtain a peace settlement in both Cuba and Vietnam. Garrison also believed that Shaw, Banister, and Ferrie had conspired to set up Oswald as a patsy in the JFK assassination.

== Death ==
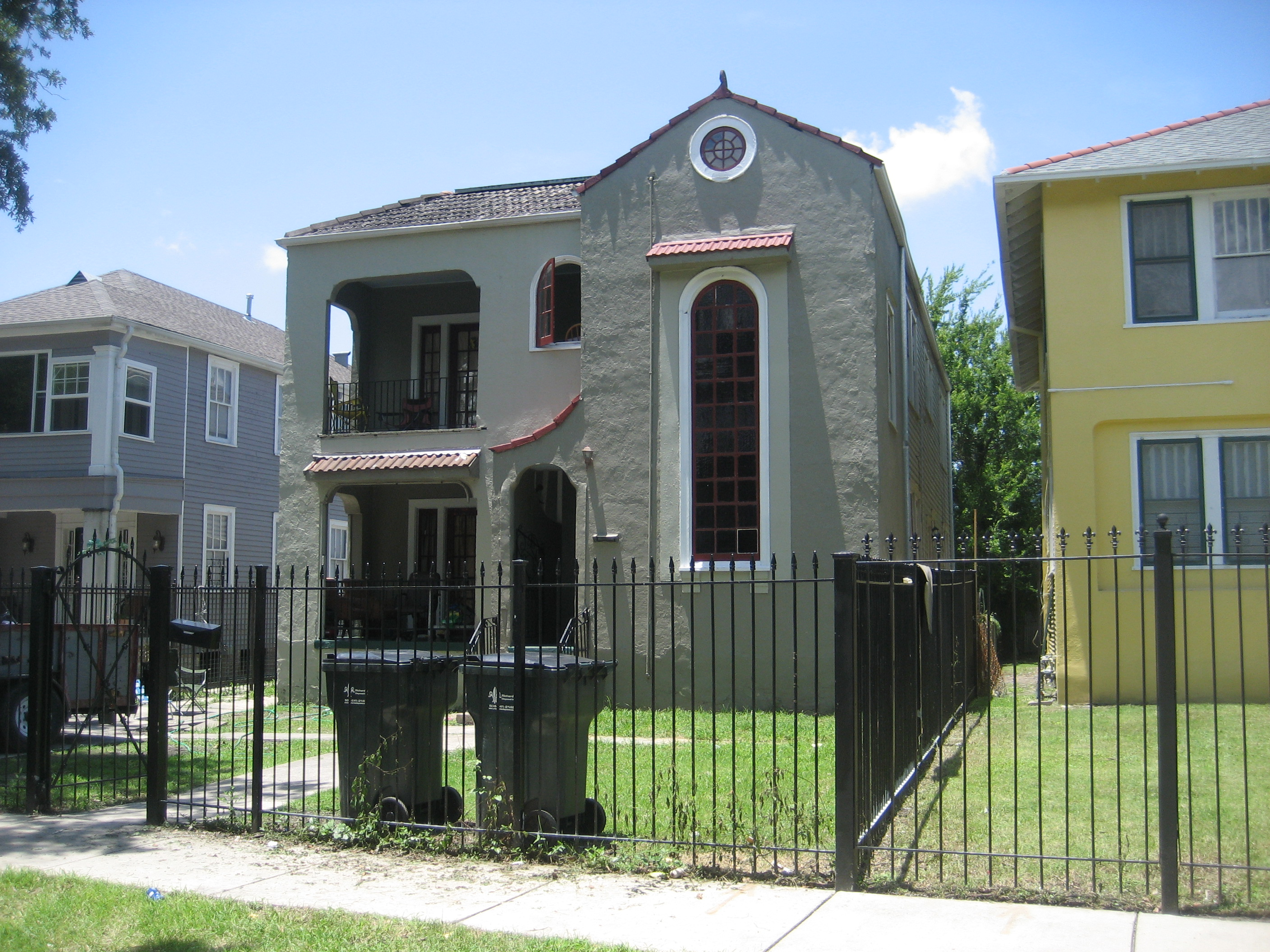
Ferrie lived in the upstairs of this two story house located on Louisiana Avenue Parkway in the Broadmoor section of New Orleans.

On February 22, 1967, less than a week after the now-defunct afternoon newspaper the New Orleans States-Item broke the story of Garrison's investigation, Ferrie was found dead in his apartment. Two unsigned, undated typed letters were found at Ferrie's apartment. The first, found in a pile of papers, was a screed about the justice system, beginning with "To leave this life is, for me, a sweet prospect. I find nothing in it that is desirable and on the other hand, everything that is loathsome." The second note was written to Al Beauboeuf, Ferrie's friend to whom he bequeathed all his possessions. Garrison said he considered Ferrie's death a suicide, but added "I am not ruling out murder." Garrison's aide, Lou Ivon, stated that Ferrie telephoned him the day after the story of Garrison's investigation broke and told him: "You know what this news story does to me, don't you. I'm a dead man. From here on, believe me, I'm a dead man."

Ferrie's autopsy was performed by Orleans Parish coroner Nicholas Chetta and pathologist Ronald A. Welsh. They concluded that there was no evidence of suicide or murder and that Ferrie died of a massive cerebral hemorrhage due to a congenital intracranial berry aneurysm that had ruptured at the base of his brain. Upon learning of the coroner's findings, Garrison said, "I suppose it could just be a weird coincidence that the night Ferrie penned two suicide notes, he died of natural causes." On March 1, 1967, Garrison had Shaw arrested and charged him with conspiring to assassinate Kennedy. Jack Wardlaw, then with the States-Item, and his fellow journalist Rosemary James, a native of South Carolina, co-authored Plot or Politics, a 1967 book which takes issue with the Garrison investigation. Wardlaw won an Associated Press award for his story on the death of Ferrie.

== Allegations regarding a relationship between Ferrie and Oswald ==
In an initial interview with the House Select Committee on Assassinations in 1978, Banister's long-time friend and secretary, Delphine Roberts, stated that she had never seen Oswald; however, in a subsequent interview she stated that she had seen Oswald in Banister's office several times. According to Roberts, the first time she saw Oswald in Banister's office was when he interviewed for a job in the summer of 1963 and on another occasion he brought his wife, Marina, with him. Reporter Earl Golz wrote that Roberts said Oswald had interviewed for the position of "undercover agent" and that he and Ferrie - who she said was "detective agent" for Banister - had together attended an anti-Castro training camp for rifle practice. The HSCA investigated Roberts's claims and said that "because of contradictions in Roberts' statements to the committee and lack of independent corroboration of many of her statements, the reliability of her statements could not be determined."

In 1979, the HSCA stated in its Final Report that Oswald – who had been living in New Orleans in the summer of 1963 – had established contact with anti-Castro Cubans and "apparently" with American anti-Castro activist Ferrie. The committee also found "credible and significant" the testimony of six witnesses who placed Oswald and Ferrie together in Clinton, Louisiana, in September 1963. In 1979, the House Select Committee on Assassinations stated that available records "lent substantial credence to the possibility that Oswald and [David] Ferrie had been involved in the same [Civil Air Patrol] unit during the same period of time." Committee investigators found six witnesses who said that Oswald had been present at Civil Air Patrol meetings headed by Ferrie.

David Ferrie (second from left) and a teenage Lee Harvey Oswald (far right) in a group photo of the New Orleans Civil Air Patrol in 1955

=== Frontline photograph ===
In 1993, the PBS television program Frontline obtained a group photograph, taken eight years before the assassination, that showed Oswald and Ferrie at a cookout with other Civil Air Patrol cadets. Frontline executive producer Michael Sullivan said, "one should be cautious in ascribing its meaning. The photograph does give much support to the eyewitnesses who say they saw Ferrie and Oswald together in the CAP, and it makes Ferrie's denials that he ever knew Oswald less credible. But it does not prove that the two men were with each other in 1963, nor that they were involved in a conspiracy to kill the president." John Ciravolo, the owner of the photo, told author Patricia Lambert: "I'm in the picture... I'm sure David Ferrie wouldn't remember me either." Author John C. McAdams wrote: "The photo doesn't prove that they ever met or talked to each other, but only that they were in the organization at the same time."

== In media ==
Ferrie was portrayed by actor Joe Pesci in the Oliver Stone film JFK (1991), by Tobin Bell in the film Ruby (1992), and by Louis Vanaria in the movie The Irishman (2019), also starring Pesci.

The 1988 historical fiction novel Libra by Don DeLillo features Ferrie as a conspirator in a plot to assassinate president Kennedy.
