= Jack Beers =

American photojournalist (1923–1975)

- Beers c. 1963
- Born: Ira Jefferson Beers Jr. July 14, 1923; Dallas, Texas, U.S.
- Died: February 17, 1975 (aged 51); Dallas, Texas, U.S.
- Other name: Ira Jefferson
- Occupation: Photojournalist

Ira Jefferson Beers Jr. (July 14, 1923 – February 17, 1975), known professionally as Jack Beers, was an American photojournalist who worked for The Dallas Morning News. Beers was best known for his widely distributed photograph capturing Jack Ruby lunging toward Lee Harvey Oswald as Ruby shot Oswald on November 24, 1963. He also took a famous photograph of football player Kyle Rote en route to a touchdown in 1948 – the only other photograph to be featured on a full page in The Dallas Morning News over a 25-year period.

== Early life and education ==
Ira Jefferson Beers Jr. was born in Parkland Hospital in Dallas, Texas, on July 14, 1923. An only child, his parents divorced when he was seven; he was raised by his mother during the Great Depression. Upon graduating from Woodrow Wilson High School, he joined the Army Air Forces and worked as a photographer.

== Career ==
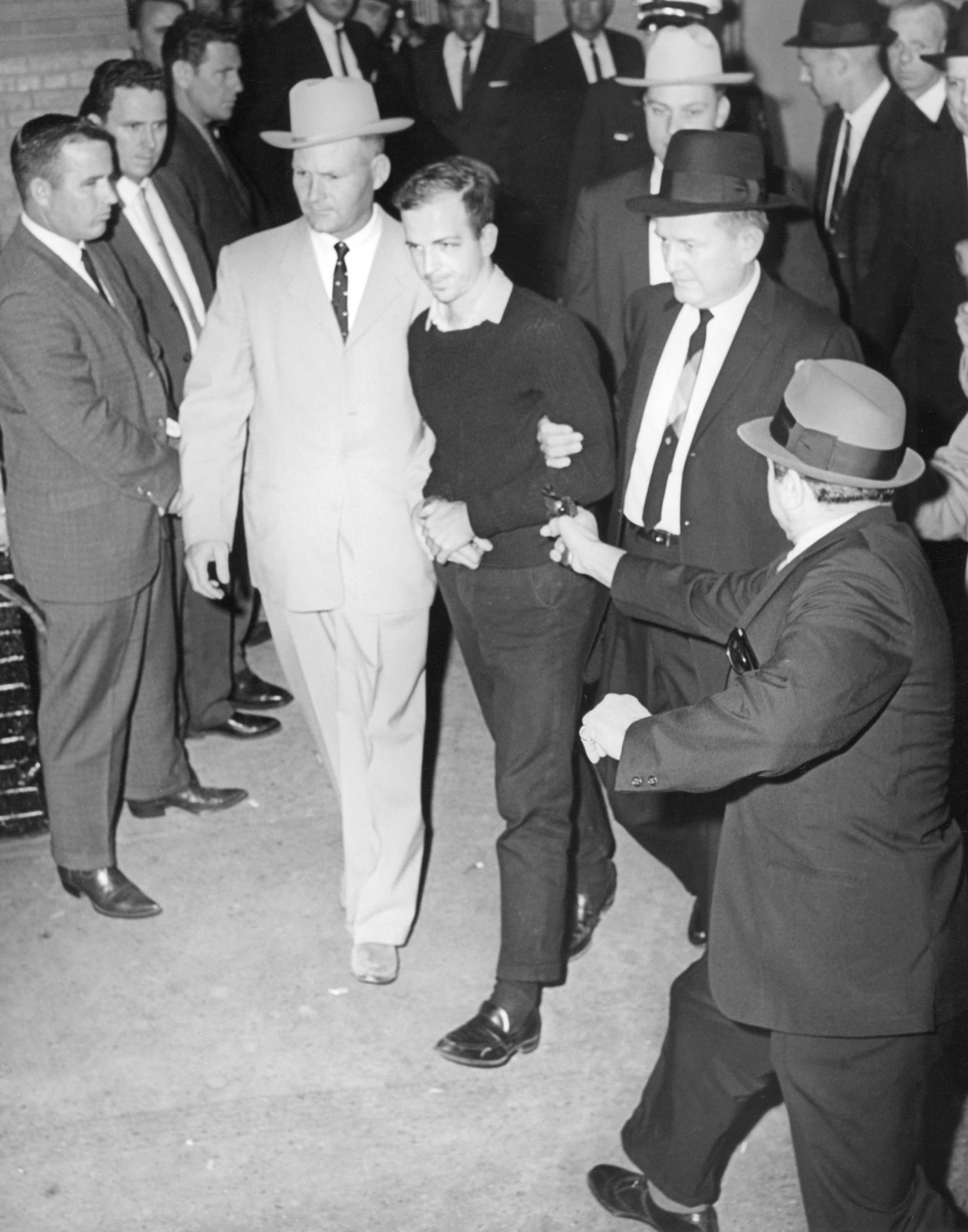
Beers' picture of Jack Ruby the instant before shooting Lee Harvey Oswald in Dallas on November 24, 1963.

After his military service, Beers was hired by The Dallas Times Herald, where he worked for nearly three years, then moved to The Dallas Morning News in 1948. During his career, he captured many dramatic photographs, including one of football player Kyle Rote of Southern Methodist University smiling as he headed for a touchdown through the Notre Dame defensive line, which ran as a full-page picture in the Morning News in 1949. He often accompanied the Dallas Police to take pictures for crime stories, and was acquainted with strip-club owner Jack Ruby.

On November 22, 1963, moments before the assassination of President John F. Kennedy, Beers took a sweep shot with a movie camera of people looking down at the presidential motorcade in the surrounding buildings, including the Texas School Book Depository. Although a shadow was visible in a corner window of the sixth floor, the person could not be identified from the footage.

At 9 a.m. on November 24, 1963, Beers joined other photographers, television cameramen, and reporters in the basement of Dallas City Hall, positioning for a view of suspected assassin Lee Harvey Oswald as he was being transferred from the city jail to the larger county jail. Over two hours later, as Oswald was being brought into the basement, Beers had his twin-reflex camera focused on Oswald and the guards, when he sensed a sudden movement of a man (Jack Ruby) several feet away from him. Beer's instinct was to take the photograph before the man, who he assumed was a cameraman, obstructed his view. The picture captured Ruby, holding a 38-caliber Colt Cobra revolver, stepping forward a split-second before shooting Oswald. A 2002 article describes the picture as “showing Ruby emerging from the shadows with gun fully extended. But the look on Oswald's face -sullen, indifferent, even bored -and that of the officers leading him in handcuffs indicates none of them has even seen Ruby, much less sensed the impending chaos”.

The Dallas Morning News immediately ran Beers' photograph as a full-page picture. He wrote an article about his experience on the day of Oswald's murder for the Associated Press. Beers was also called to testify in front of the Warren Commission.

== Personal life and death ==
Beers' rival at The Dallas Times Herald, Robert H. Jackson, took a similar photo, but approximately six-tenths of a second later, after the shot was fired and as Oswald screamed in pain. That photo was awarded the Pulitzer Prize in 1964. According to his daughter, Beers suffered from depression that went untreated, due to "missing out" on the recognition that Jackson received.

Beers died of a heart attack at his home in Dallas on February 17, 1975. A few months after his death, FBI agents asked The Dallas Morning News for the negatives of three photographs taken by Beers shortly after Oswald's murder. The photographs were of "three shabbily dressed men at Dealey Plaza" whom the FBI said had mysteriously not been booked or fingerprinted.
