= Robert H. Jackson (photographer) =

American photographer (born 1934)

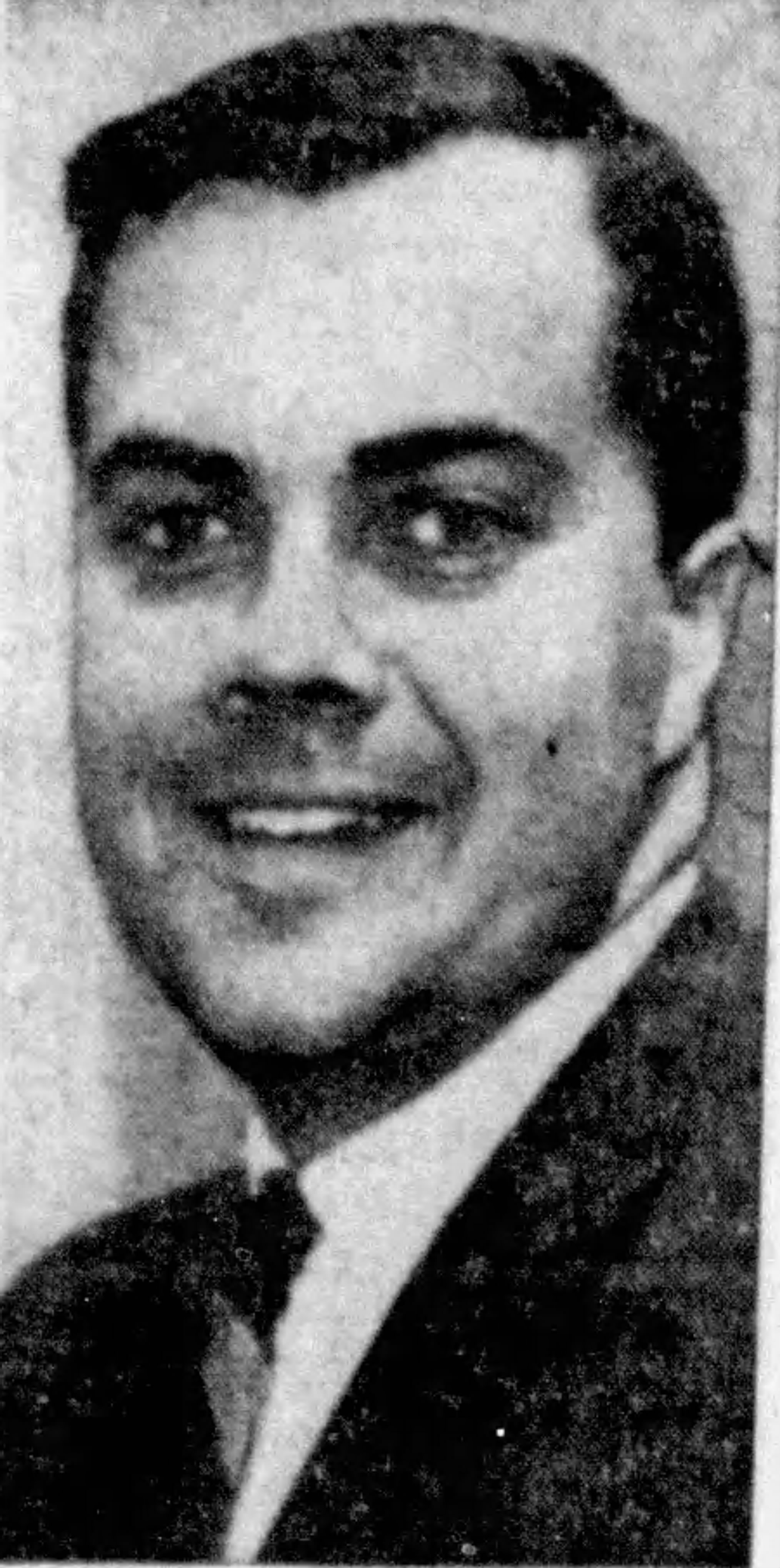
- Jackson in 1964
- Born: Robert Hill Jackson; April 8, 1934 (age 92); Dallas, Texas, U.S.
- Occupation: Photographer
- Known for: 1964 Pulitzer Prize for Photography
- Notable work: Jack Ruby Shoots Lee Harvey Oswald

Robert Hill Jackson (born April 8, 1934) is an American photographer. In November 1963, Jackson, then working for the Dallas Times Herald, took a photograph capturing the fatal shooting of Lee Harvey Oswald by Jack Ruby. Jackson won the Pulitzer Prize for Photography for the photograph in 1964.

== Early life and career ==
Born on April 8, 1934, Jackson grew up in Dallas. His interest in photography began when he was either at the age of twelve years or thirteen years. An aunt gave him a Baby Brownie Special camera, and a family cat became one of his first subjects. When Jackson turned fourteen years old, his interest became more serious. Another aunt gave him an Argus C-3 35 mm camera. Jackson's first news photo was of a double fatality crash in northern Dallas. Jackson persuaded his father to drive him to the scene of the crash. His second news photo was of an airplane crash at Love Field. Jackson attended Highland Park High School, and later Southern Methodist University, leaving the university in 1957.

His photography interest grew when he began photographing sports car racing. He joined the 36th Infantry National Guard. While in the Army, Jackson became a photographer for an Army general. In August 1960, the Dallas Times Herald hired him.

== November 1963 ==
Jackson's Pulitzer Prize-winning photograph, Jack Ruby Shoots Lee Harvey Oswald, capturing the instant of Jack Ruby shooting Lee Harvey Oswald

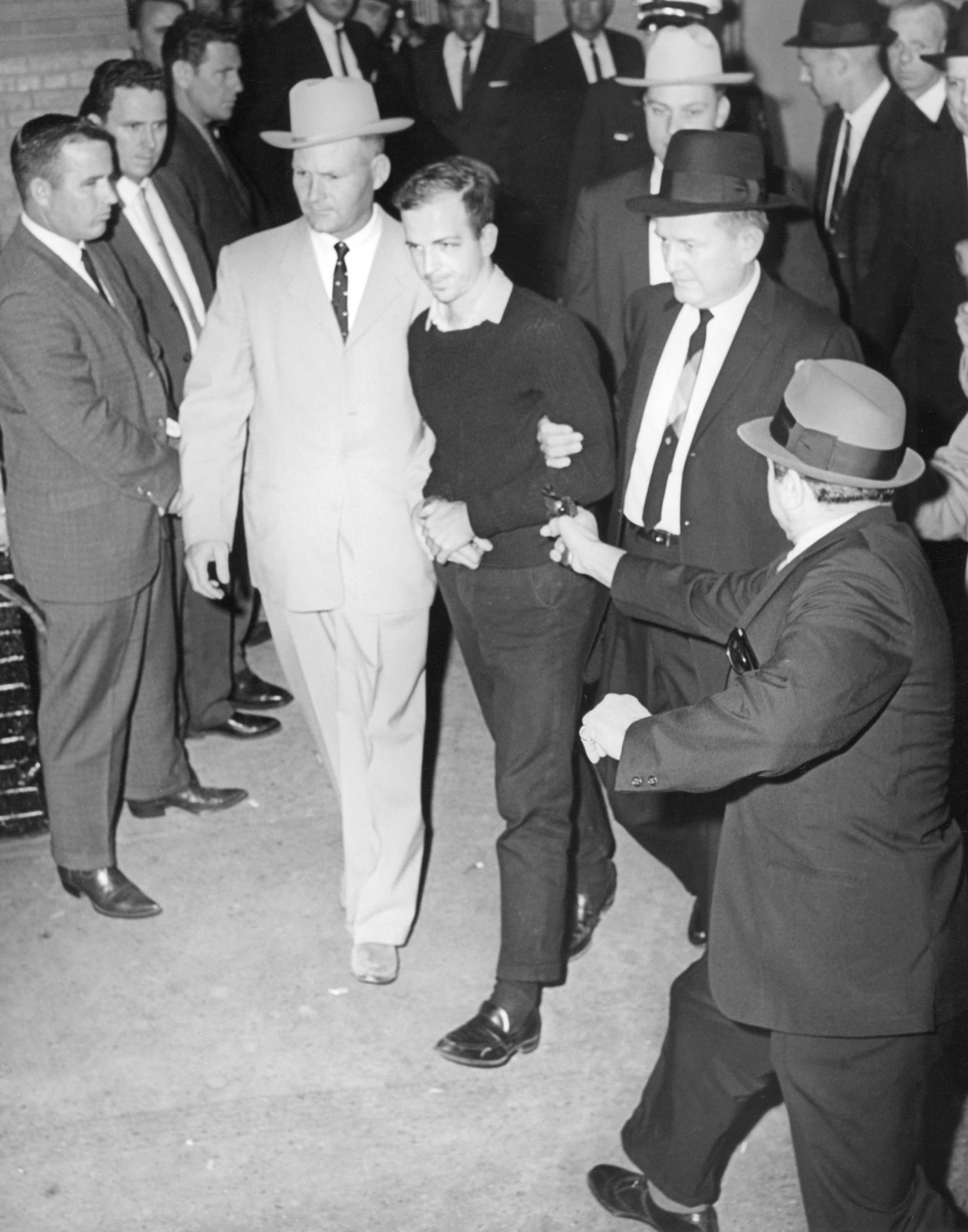
Jack Beers's picture, taken just a second prior to Jackson's

On November 22, 1963, Jackson was assigned to cover the arrival of President John F. Kennedy at Dallas Love Field and his motorcade through the city. Jackson and many other journalists traveled with the President and first lady from the airport. He was in the eighth vehicle behind the presidential limousine as the motorcade headed down Elm Street. Jackson was sitting atop the back seat of the convertible as the motorcade approached Dealey Plaza. He was in the process of changing film when the shots were fired; but his camera was empty. He had just removed a roll of film to hand-off to another newspaper employee, and had not yet reloaded. However, he was among the few people who thought that they saw a rifle barrel in the window of the book depository. After the assassination, Jackson remained in Dealey Plaza, but took no more photos, something he later regretted.

Two days later, Jackson was told to go to the police station to photograph the transfer of Oswald to the county jail. Using his Nikon S3 35mm rangefinder camera with a strobe and using Kodak Tri-X film, During the transfer, Oswald was shot and mortally wounded by Jack Ruby in the Dallas police station garage. Jackson photographed the event the instant after Ruby shot Oswald. In his photo, Ruby’s gun has the signs of muzzle flash and smoke rings, and Oswald is impacted by the bullet, his eyes are clenched shut with his mouth opened wide to scream in pain in an anguished expression and his manacled hands are moving to clutch at his stomach, while Dallas police detective Jim Leavelle who was handcuffed to Oswald, reacts. In March 1964, Jackson was called to testify in front of the Warren Commission.

Jackson's colleague Jack Beers at The Dallas Morning News took an almost identical photo, but six-tenths of a second earlier, the instant before Ruby fired. Beers was also called to testify in front of the Warren Commission.

== Later life ==
In later life, Jackson was a staff photographer for the Colorado Springs Gazette-Telegraph. He retired from the Gazette in 1999. He has three daughters, two sons from his wife's previous marriage and a son with his current wife. As of November 2013, he has 10 grandchildren and resides in Manitou Springs, Colorado.

In 2021, on the fifty-eighth anniversary of the Kennedy assassination, Jackson said "Every photographer would like to shoot an image that has meaning. I hated to see it happen in Dallas. But I was glad that I was able to cover a moment in history, in time."

Jackson believes Oswald acted alone and rejects conspiracy theories surrounding the assassination.
