= Jack Ruby Shoots Lee Harvey Oswald =

Photograph taken in 1963

Jack Ruby Shoots Lee Harvey Oswald, November 24, 1963

Jack Ruby Shoots Lee Harvey Oswald is a 1963 photograph of nightclub owner Jack Ruby shooting Lee Harvey Oswald. The image was captured by Dallas Times Herald photographer Robert H. Jackson and it won the 1964 Pulitzer Prize for Photography.

Jackson took the photograph in the basement of the Dallas jail at the exact moment when Jack Ruby shot Lee Harvey Oswald. Another reporter, Jack Beers of The Dallas Morning News, took a similar photo a split-second before Ruby fired the shot.

In addition to the Pulitzer Prize, the Jackson image also won awards from the Texas Headliners Club and Sigma Delta Chi. In 2019, The New York Times said the image was "chillingly captured".

== Photographer ==
Jackson was born on April 8, 1934 and he grew up in Dallas, Texas. He had an interest in photography when he was a child; as a result, Jackson's aunt gave him a Kodak Brownie camera. At the age of 14, he became more serious about photography, and another aunt of his gave him a Argus C-3 35 mm camera. Jackson's first news photos were of crashes in the Dallas area. Jackson began working for the Dallas Times Herald in 1960 as a staff photographer.

== Background ==
On November 22, 1963, U.S. President John F. Kennedy was assassinated in Dallas, Texas. Lee Harvey Oswald was arrested and charged by Dallas Police with the killings of President Kennedy and Dallas policeman J. D. Tippit. Two days later, Dallas police made arrangements to transfer Oswald to the county jail. The police had notified news agencies that the scheduled time to move Oswald was 9:15 a.m. so Jackson arrived before 9:00 a.m. to get ready. However, authorities did not begin to move Oswald until after 11:00 a.m. Approximately fifty people were in the basement of the Dallas jail to see Oswald's transfer.

At 11:21 a.m., as Oswald was being taken through the basement, Jack Ruby stepped forward with a gun and shot Oswald at point blank range, mortally wounding him. Jackson snapped a photograph the instant Oswald was shot. Jackson said he had no idea that he had captured the moment of the shooting until the film was developed. On November 25, 1963, the image was published on the front page of the Dallas Times Herald.

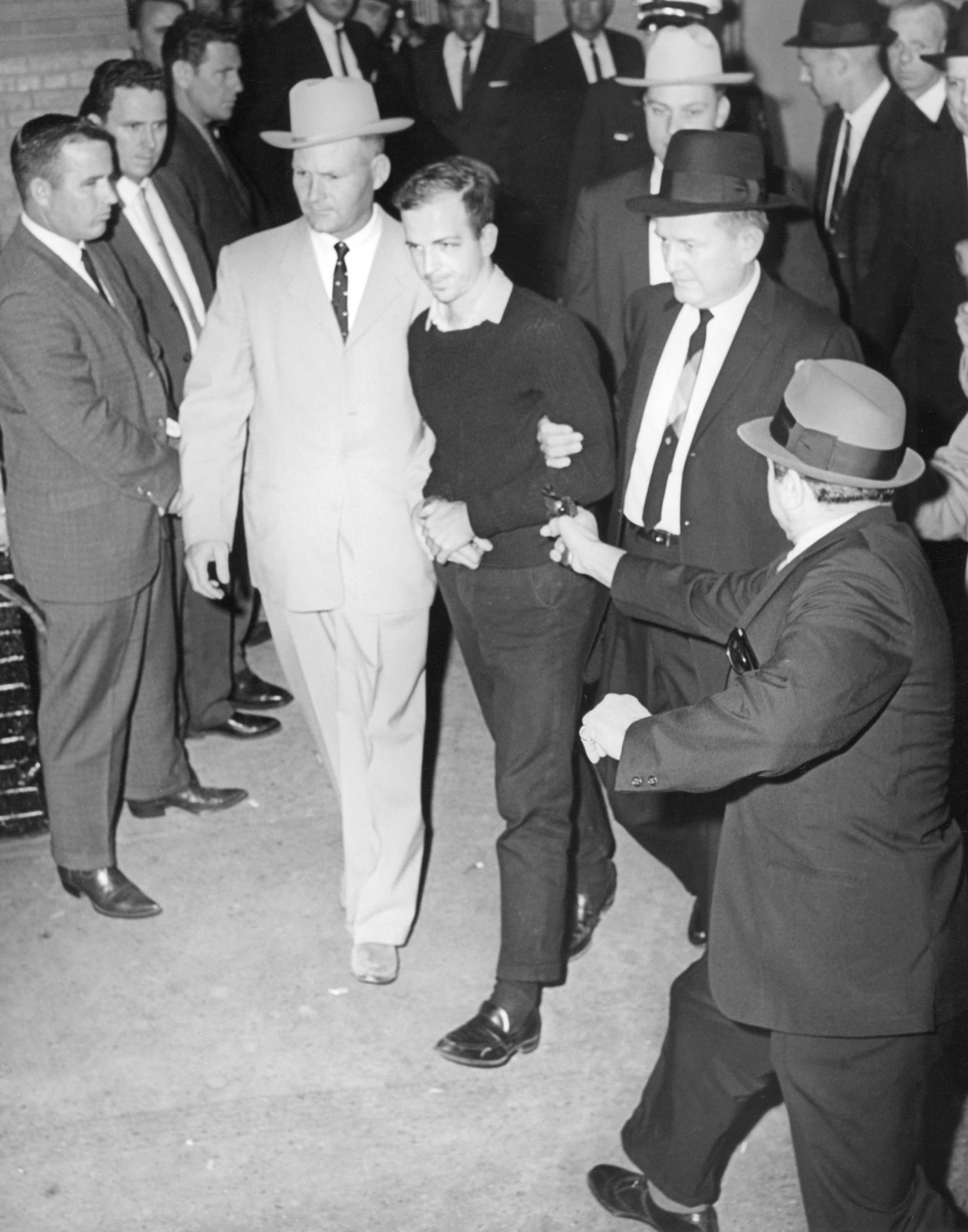
Jack Beers's photograph taken a split second before Jack Ruby shot Lee Harvey Oswald

There was competition in the newspaper business and Jack Beers, who worked for The Dallas Morning News, captured a similar image which was taken six-tenths of a second before Jackson's. Beers' image was first to press but the Jackson image was preferred because it captured the instant of Oswald being shot. Beers's image showed Ruby already stepping forward with his .38-caliber Colt Cobra revolver the instant before he fired. A 2002 article describes the picture as “showing Ruby emerging from the shadows with gun fully extended. But the look on Oswald's face -sullen, indifferent, even bored -and that of the officers leading him in handcuffs indicates none of them has even seen Ruby, much less sensed the impending chaos”. Beers's friends and family said he never got over the fact that he missed capturing the Pulitzer Prize-winning photograph.

When authorities notified the reporters in the police headquarters basement that Oswald was coming, Jackson got his Nikon S3 35 mm camera ready. Jackson had been to the Dallas Police headquarters basement for prisoner transfers many times so he knew where to stand in order to get the best photograph. He said, "I picked a spot... I prefocused the camera about 11 feet in front of me." Jackson said as part of his preparation, he made sure to check the camera's wind lever multiple times. Jackson was initially blocked and had to lean across a vehicle to get a vantage point. The reporters were arranged in a semi-circle and the door where Oswald would enter was 11 ft (3.4 m) in front of them. Jackson also readied his camera's flash before looking into his camera's view finder to see Oswald approaching.

== Photograph ==
Oswald had taken eight to ten steps toward the reporters when Ruby stepped forward. Jackson said, "He [Ruby] fired, and I hit the shutter". Jackson almost lost his camera in the scrum that followed the shooting; an officer grabbed the camera but Jackson held firm. The image Jackson captured was the exact moment after the shot was fired; Ruby’s gun has the signs of muzzle flash and smoke rings, and Oswald is impacted by the bullet, his eyes are clenched shut with his mouth opened wide to scream in pain in an anguished expression and his manacled hands are moving to clutch at his stomach. Also in the image, Dallas Police Detective Jim Leavelle reacts to the shooting. Leavelle was wearing a white Stetson cowboy hat in the image and his left wrist was handcuffed to Oswald's right wrist. One of the reasons that the image was so compelling is that it captured the terror of the men in the frame. Other photographers and television cameras also captured the dramatic scene but according to The Denver Post, "No one produced an image like Jackson's".

Jackson returned to his newsroom with his undeveloped film, and the "Jack Beers picture was already on the wire." Before Jackson developed the film, reporters at his newspaper asked, "Do you have anything as good?" After Jackson developed the image and showed it, a reporter named Vivian Castleberry said, "All of Dallas could have heard the screaming from that room when he developed that picture and the image came out of what he had."

== Reception ==
The image won the 1964 Pulitzer Prize for Photography and received international recognition. When Jackson was told that the image had won the Pulitzer, he said, "I am in a state of shock". The image also won other awards including the Texas Headliners Club award and the Sigma Delta Chi award for Best News Picture of the Year. The impact of the image has been enduring. In 2013, Columbia University associate professor Nina Berman said, "The still [image] crystallizes this whole moment. You keep looking at it to see if anyone can see what is going to happen. ... It is such a fantastically composed picture". In 2019, The New York Times described the image by saying, "The shooting, with Mr. Oswald's pained grimace and Detective Leavelle's stricken glower, was chillingly captured".

== See also ==
- List of photographs considered the most important
- Saigon Execution, another Pulitzer-winning photo of a person at the moment they were fatally shot
