= Howard Brennan =

American writer and witness to assassination of John F. Kennedy

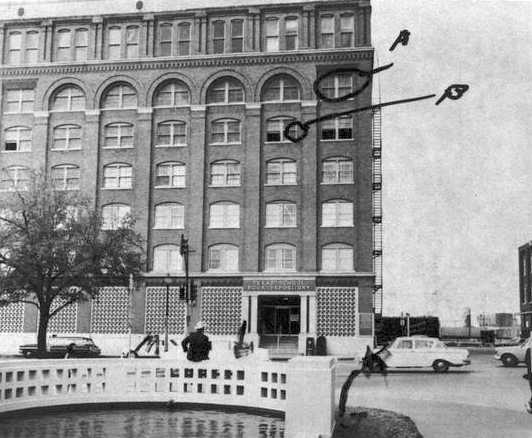
- Howard Brennan sitting across from the Texas School Book Depository in Dallas. Circle "A" indicates where he saw a man fire a gun at President Kennedy's motorcade. Circle "B" indicates the window in which he saw "colored guys" watching the motorcade.
- Born: Howard Leslie Brennan; March 20, 1919; Texas, U.S.
- Died: December 22, 1983 (aged 64)
- Occupation: Steamfitter
- Known for: Witnessing the assassination of John F. Kennedy

Howard Leslie Brennan (March 20, 1919 – December 22, 1983) was an American memoirist and steamfitter who was witness to the assassination of United States President John F. Kennedy in Dallas, Texas on November 22, 1963. According to the Warren Commission, Brennan's description of a sniper he saw was probative in reaching the conclusion that the shots came from the sixth floor, southeast corner window of the Texas School Book Depository Building.

== Brennan's voluntary statement after the assassination ==
Minutes after the Kennedy's assassination, Brennan quickly reported his observations to Dallas County Sheriff's Deputies. He said he sat across from the red brick School Book Depository, seven stories high, waiting for the JFK parade. As he waited he saw a man at the east end of the building, one storey from the top. The man was simply sitting in that window and looking down at the parade route.

He was a white man in his early 30s, slender, nice-looking, and would weigh about 165 to 175 pounds [75 to 79 kg].

According to the National Archives, this description likely led to the radio alert sent to police cars at about 12:45 p.m., which described the suspect as white, slender, weighing about 165 pounds (75 kg), about 5 feet 10 inches (178 cm) tall, and in his early thirties. Brennan continued:

Then this man let the gun down to his side and stepped down out of sight... I could see this man from about his belt up... I believe that I could identify this man if I ever saw him again.

== Brennan at the police line-up ==
During the line-up (a.k.a. "show-up") of Lee Harvey Oswald, however, Howard Brennan failed to positively identify Oswald as the shooter that he had seen in the window. He would only tell the police (referring to Oswald in the lineup): "He looks like him. But the man I saw wasn't disheveled like this fella.... I just can't be positive."

== Brennan's Warren Commission testimony ==
Brennan identified himself as a 45-year-old steamfitter. In his testimony, he spoke about how he watched the presidential motorcade from a concrete retaining wall at the southwest corner of Elm and Houston streets in Dealey Plaza, where he had a clear view of the south side of the Texas School Book Depository Building. Brennan arrived at about 12:22 p.m. While he was waiting for the motorcade, he observed the others in the crowd. Brennan watched several people in and around the Texas School Book Depository and made special note of a man he saw appear at an open window at the southeast corner of the sixth floor, which was 120 feet (37 m) from where he was standing. He observed the man leave the window "a couple of times." Some critics questioned whether Brennan could have seen clearly and accurately at that distance.

During his testimony, Brennan stated that he watched the parade as the presidential limousine turned the corner at Houston and Elm and headed toward the railroad underpass. He heard a loud noise that he "positively thought was a backfire" just after the president had passed his location.

Well, then something, just right after this explosion, made me think that it was a firecracker being thrown from the Texas Book Store. And I glanced up. And this man that I saw previous was aiming for his last shot. . . . Well, as it appeared to me he was standing up and resting against the left window sill, with gun shouldered to his right shoulder, holding the gun with his left hand and taking positive aim and fired his last shot. As I calculate a couple of seconds. He drew the gun back from the window as though he was drawing it back to his side and maybe paused for another second as though to assure himself that he hit his mark, and then he disappeared.

A description of the suspect was broadcast to all Dallas police at 12:45 p.m., 12:48 p.m., and 12:55 p.m. At about 1:10 p.m., Lee Harvey Oswald shot and killed Patrolman J. D. Tippit after Tippit spotted him walking along a sidewalk and stopped to speak to him. After the Tippit shooting, a description of Oswald came out, and it was noticed that the description of the man who shot the police officer was very similar to the description given after the president was shot. Oswald fled and was later captured in a nearby movie theater. Later the same evening Brennan identified Oswald in a police lineup as the person who most closely resembled the man in the window, but Brennan said he was unable to make a positive identification. A few hours prior to seeing the line-up, Brennan had observed a picture of Oswald on television. Brennan attributed this to part of the reason he felt he could not make a positive identification, he did not want the image to have impacted his decision. On December 17, 1963, he told the FBI that he was sure that Oswald was the rifleman he had seen in the window.

Several months later, Brennan also testified before the Warren Commission. During extensive questioning, he stated that at the time of the lineup, he believed the assassination was part of a conspiracy, and he was afraid for the safety of himself and his family if he could identify the shooter. But he told the commission that since Oswald had been killed, he no longer felt it was dangerous to identify him. When asked if he was positive the man in the sixth floor window he saw shoot at the motorcade was the same one he saw in the police lineup, he answered: "I could at that time-I could, with all sincerity, identify him as being the same man." Because Brennan declined to make a positive identification in the police lineup, the commission regarded Brennan's subsequent testimony (that he sincerely believed he saw Oswald), as probative but not conclusive evidence that Oswald was the gunman in the sixth-floor window.

In June 1967, the Associated Press released a 15-page report, prepared by journalists Bernard Gavzer and Sid Moody, that summarized the news agency's six-month investigation supporting the Warren Commission's findings; the report also addressed some of the allegations of its critics and accused them of building their cases upon deliberate omissions. Gavzer and Moody wrote that Warren Commission critics attempted to weaken the case for a shooter in the Texas School Book Depository by attempting to weaken Brennan's testimony, then discussed specific charges leveled by authors Edward Jay Epstein and Mark Lane. Indicating that Epstein wrote that Warren Commission attorney Joseph Ball told him that he was "extremely dubious" about Brennan's testimony and that Brennan was unable to discern a figure in the building's sixth floor window, Gavzer and Moody quoted Ball denying that he had made those statements about Brennan. They also noted that Lane wrote about Brennan's statement to the Commission that he had poor eyesight, but that Lane did not mention that Brennan testified he was farsighted at the time of the assassination nor did he emphasize that the vision loss Brennan sustained occurred two months after the assassination.

The House Select Committee on Assassinations cited Howard Brennan in 1979 as support for its conclusion that one of the assassins that shot at President Kennedy did so from the Book Depository Building.

Brennan's memoir Eyewitness to History: The Kennedy Assassination as Seen by Howard L. Brennan, written with J. Edward Cherryholmes, was published posthumously in 1987 by Texian Press. (ISBN 0872440761)
