= Dallas Times Herald =

Former daily newspaper in Dallas, Texas

- Front page of The Dallas Times Herald on November 25, 1963, covering the murder of Lee Harvey Oswald
- Founded: 1888
- Ceased publication: December 8, 1991
- OCLC number: 1565849

The Dallas Times Herald, founded in 1888 by a merger of the Dallas Times and the Dallas Herald, was a major daily newspaper serving the Dallas, Texas, area from 1888 to 1991. It won three Pulitzer Prizes, all for photography, and two George Polk Awards, for local and regional reporting.

== Decline and closure ==
As an afternoon publication for most of its 102 years, its demise was hastened by the shift of newspaper reading habits to morning papers, the reliance on television for late-breaking news, as well as the loss of an antitrust lawsuit against crosstown rival The Dallas Morning News after the latter's parent company bought the rights to 26 Universal Press Syndicate features that previously had been running in the Times Herald.

MediaNews Group bought the Times Herald from the Times Mirror Company in 1986; Times Mirror had owned the paper since 1969. MediaNews sold the paper in 1988 to a company formed by John Buzzetta, a former partner of MediaNews Group's founder, Dean Singleton.

Roy E. Bode, who previously worked as Washington Bureau Chief of the paper and later as its associate editor, became its last editor-in-chief. Despite financial pressures, the Times Herald continued to operate its own news bureaus in Washington, Austin, Houston, San Antonio and other Texas cities, and did not lay off journalists during its final years. It also produced Pulitzer finalists and won other national journalism honors. According to Burl Osborne, the former publisher of the Morning News, the Times Herald shut down on December 8, 1991. The next day, Belo Corporation, owner of the Morning News, bought the Times Herald assets for $55 million and sold the physical equipment to a variety of buyers to disperse the assets and thus prevent any other entity from easily re-establishing a competitive newspaper in Dallas.

== Archives ==
Microfilm copies of the Dallas Times Herald can be found in the Dallas Public Library archival collection. The collection includes December 1855 – December 1991, with a gap from January through October 1886.

== Awards ==
=== Pulitzer Prizes ===
- 1964 — Photography — Robert H. Jackson for a photo of Jack Ruby shooting Lee Harvey Oswald
- 1980 — Feature Photography — Erwin "Skeeter" Hagler for a photo series on Texas cowboys
- 1983 — Feature Photography — James B. Dickman for photos of life and death in El Salvador

=== George Polk Awards ===
- 1978 — Local Reporting — For reporting on Mexican-Americans killed by Texas lawmen
- 1982 — Regional Reporting — Jim Henderson for his series, "Racism in the South"

=== Missouri Lifestyle Journalism Awards ===
- 1982 — General Excellence

== Notable former staff ==
- Skip Bayless, sports columnist and author
- John Bloom, syndicated film critic (a.k.a. Joe Bob Briggs), writer, and actor (Casino)
- Hector Cantu, co-creator, Baldo comic strip
- Shelby Coffey III, editor and vice president
- Lee Cullum, NPR and PBS commentator, columnist, and producer and host for KERA Television
- Jay Dickman, photojournalist and winner of the 1982 Pulitzer Prize for feature photography
- Rodger Dean Duncan, bestselling author, Forbes magazine contributor
- Najlah Feanny, contract photographer for Newsweek
- John Clark, features news editor and former editorial director at American Airlines Publishing
- Mike Goldman, managing editor of Boys' Life magazine
- A. C. Greene, journalist, author, television commentator, historian; editorial page editor at time of John F. Kennedy Assassination After sale of Times Herald and KRLD-TV to Los Angeles Times, became a major stockholder
- Paul Hagen, baseball writer and 2013 recipient of the J. G. Taylor Spink Award from the Baseball Writers' Association of America
- Irwin “Skeeter” Hagler, photojournalist and winner of the 1980 Pulitzer Prize for feature photography
- Ray F. Herndon, UPI Vietnam War photojournalist and bureau chief, a finalist for the 1991 Pulitzer Prize for investigative reporting
- Molly Ivins, syndicated columnist and author
- Robert H. Jackson (photographer) best known for his photo of Ruby shooting Oswald
- Dan Jenkins, sportswriter and author
- Tom Johnson, publisher
- Iris Krasnow, best-selling author specializing in relationships and personal growth
- Jim Lehrer, author and anchor of The NewsHour with Jim Lehrer on PBS; was a Times Herald reporter at the time of John F. Kennedy assassination
- Ernest Makovy, night city editor and who launched a series of assistants onto editing careers with his ability to do re-writing.
- Margaret Mayer, who as chief of the Dallas Times-Herald's Washington bureau became one of the first women to hold such a position.
- Scott Monserud, sports editor, Denver Post
- Michael Phillips, theater critic, later theater critic for Los Angeles Times and Chicago Tribune; current Tribune film critic
- Mark Potok, reporter, spokesperson, Southern Poverty Law Center
- Steven Reddicliffe, television critic
- Don Safran, film critic, also a publicist for Columbia Pictures
- Gaylord Shaw, managing editor, won 1978 Pulitzer Prize with Los Angeles Times
- Blackie Sherrod, award-winning sports columnist and commentator, author of several sportsbooks
- Bud Shrake, sportswriter, screenwriter, and author
- Mickey Spagnola, writer for DallasCowboys.com
- Lisa Taylor, journalist, entertainment writer and editor
- Bascom N. Timmons, later opened a news bureau in Washington to serve newspapers in several states
- Tara Weingarten, automotive journalist, Newsweek writer, founder of VroomGirls
- Robert Wilonsky, entertainment reporter
