= Dallas Herald =

Name of two newspapers in Dallas, Texas

Two newspapers of general circulation in Dallas, Texas (USA) have operated under the name Dallas Herald.

== First Dallas Herald (1849-1885) ==
The first permanent settler of Dallas, John Neely Bryan, settled there in 1841. The first local newspaper appeared in 1849, when James Wellington Latimer (known as “Weck,” “Wake,” and “Mark”) established a weekly newspaper, the Dallas Herald. Latimer and William Wallace had purchased the Texas Times, published in Paris, Texas, and moved it to Dallas to become the Herald. The first few issues may have appeared under the name the Cedar Snag, but the nameplate read Dallas Herald by December 1849.

Latimer became sole owner and editor when Wallace retired in 1850. John W. Swindells became part owner in 1854 and sole owner when Latimer died in 1859. It appears that J. L. Bartow acquired the publishing company in March 1877. In 1879 P. S. Pfouts, J. E. Elliott, and W. L. Hall acquired the company.

The paper was renamed the Dallas Weekly Herald in 1873. In 1874 the owners began a second publication, the Dallas Daily Herald, which appeared daily except Monday.

The Dallas Morning News began publication on October 1, 1885, and later that year acquired the Weekly Herald and the Daily Herald, both of which ceased publication on December 8, 1885. Although most accounts of the demise of the Herald papers state or imply that the Morning News purchased the papers and closed them, contemporary accounts published in the Morning News could be read to say that the Herald owners decided to invest in the Morning News and to close their papers rather than selling them to new owners. The announcement in the Morning News said in part:

“For personal and business reasons of their own, the proprietors and editors of the Dallas Herald, Col. P. S. Pfouts, Col. J. F. Elliott and Col. W. L. Hall have identified themselves with The News by becoming purchasers of its capital stock, and with sincere pleasure the announcement is made that they will hereafter contribute their individual efforts to promote the interests and secure the success of The News. This involved, of course, the discontinuance of the Dallas Herald, but no consolidation nor absorption, nor does it involve any changes in the business status, the business principles or the general policy of the News.”

In any event, demise of the Herald newspapers removed the most serious competition of the Morning News and allowed it to acquire the Western Associated Press franchise held by the Herald.

The Herald under Latimer supported the Democratic Party, slavery, transportation improvements, and education and opposed Sam Houston. It urged Democrats to select the moderate Stephen A. Douglas as the party's 1860 presidential nominee, rather than a more extreme Southern partisan because Douglas probably could be elected and would listen to the concerns of the southern states where a less moderate candidate would not likely be elected. When the Ku Klux Klan appeared in Dallas soon after the end of the Civil War, the Herald strongly condemned "the ignorant and superstitious members [of the Klan] threatening violence and revolution."

== Second Dallas Herald (1886-1888) ==
The Herald papers had been missing from the Dallas scene for barely more than a month when an item appeared in the Morning News on January 14, 1886, noting that “the first number of the Dallas Daily Herald made its appearance last evening. It is a crisp, bright paper of twenty-eight columns, in a nice new dress . . . .” Meanwhile, the Morning News continued running daily notices from Herald Publishing Company and A. H. Belo & Co. (publishers of the Morning News), dated November 30, 1885, to the effect that the Herald had turned over its subscription list to the Morning News and that the Morning News would fulfill those subscriptions with its own editions and solicited former Herald subscribers to become Morning News subscribers. These notices did not cease until early April.

H. H. Clayton operated this Herald for a few months. Clayton had been manager of the San Antonio Evening Times and in his Herald editorials often advocated for prohibition. On June 7, 1886, it was acquired by Lafayette L. Foster, a journalist and the speaker of the Texas House of Representatives.

Foster was joined that fall by Charles Edwin Gilbert, secretary of the Texas Press Association and editor of the Abilene Reporter in Abilene, Texas. Gilbert's Herald differed from its major competitor, the Morning News, by sometimes publishing one or more extra editions to report important news and in its appearance: while the Morning News was producing pages of solid gray type broken only by advertising, the Herald used wider columns and broke up its columns with small illustrations. Gilbert also was a prohibitionist and would not accept advertising for beer or other alcohol.

The paper lasted through the next year but merged with the Dallas Times to form the Daily Times-Herald, which began publication on January 2, 1888, and which eventually was renamed the Dallas Times Herald and dropped the hyphen.
