= Dallas Times =

The Dallas Times was an afternoon newspaper published in Dallas, Texas (USA) from 1876 until it merged with the Dallas Herald in 1888 to form the Daily Times Herald.

William G. Sterett, who had been in Dallas a short while and had been practicing law, bought the Times not long after it began publication. He edited it until he joined the Dallas Morning News on October 1, 1885, the day the Morning News began publication, but retained ownership until late 1888, when he sold his interest in the Times Herald to Charles Edwin Gilbert. Under Sterett’s editorial direction, the Times strongly opposed prohibition.

In January 1888 the Times merged with the Herald, which had begun publication in 1886 shortly after the oldest Dallas newspaper, also known as the Herald, quit publication. The resulting newspaper, the Daily Times Herald (later publishing under the name Dallas Times Herald), became the major afternoon Dallas newspaper and published until December 1991, when the Dallas Morning News bought it and immediately closed it.
