= H. Louis Nichols =

American lawyer

- H. Louis Nichols
- Born: November 7, 1916; Collin County, Texas
- Died: April 25, 2010 (aged 93); Dallas, Texas
- Known for: Attorney, John F. Kennedy assassination

H. Louis Nichols (November 7, 1916 – April 25, 2010) was an attorney who resided in Dallas, Texas. He is the only known attorney who visited Lee Harvey Oswald while Oswald was in custody by the Dallas Police Department after the assassination of President John F. Kennedy.

== Biography ==
Nichols was a graduate of the Southern Methodist University Law School, class of 1940. He was a lawyer in Dallas for over 60 years, practicing Civil Law. Nichols was a member of the American Bar Association; Texas Bar Association and other legal associations. During World War II, he served in the Army Corps of Engineers (1941–1946), and later retired from the United States Army Reserve in 1968, holding the rank of colonel.

== Lee Harvey Oswald ==
Nichols stated that by 2:00 pm on Saturday, November 23, 1963, he began receiving telephone calls from Dallas attorneys who were concerned that Oswald was stating he had no legal representation while being questioned by the Dallas Police Department. Oswald was being questioned at the time with regards to the assassination of President Kennedy as well as the shooting of Dallas Police officer J. D. Tippit. Law school deans were contacting the Dallas Bar Association expressing concern that "only a legal backwater would deny an attorney to a murder suspect".

Nichols, who practiced civil law in the Dallas area was the president of the Dallas Bar Association at the time. In 1963, criminal suspects in Texas had no right to a lawyer while being questioned. However, Nichols was concerned and believed that Oswald needed legal representation, despite the fact that it was clear Oswald was unable to pay for an attorney to represent him. He decided to go to the Dallas Police Department and offer his services, despite the fact he was unfamiliar with criminal law.

Upon arrival at the Police Department, he announced to police officials he was an attorney and was there to speak to Oswald. He was accompanied to Oswald's cell, where he found him sitting by himself between two empty adjacent cells, with a police officer just outside the door of the cell. Oswald was calm and rested in the cell with a bruise over one eye. He stated that the police were holding him "incommunicado" and denied killing either Kennedy or Tippit.

Oswald stated to Nichols that he wanted John Abt, an attorney from New York to represent him. Abt was associated with the American Civil Liberties Union. Nichols asked Oswald if he wanted him or a Dallas lawyer to represent him. Oswald stated "No, not right now."

Nichols then left Oswald to be alone in his cell and departed from the Dallas Police station. Nichols' visit with Oswald lasted approximately two minutes. Oswald was killed the next day by Jack Ruby.
