= Iris Krasnow =

American writer

Iris Krasnow (born 1954) is an American author, journalism professor, and speaker who specializes in relationships and personal growth. She is the author of Surrendering to Motherhood (1998), the New York Times bestseller Surrendering to Marriage (2002), Surrendering to Yourself (2003), I Am My Mother's Daughter (2007), and The Secret Lives of Wives (2011). Krasnow's sixth book, Sex After...Women Share How Intimacy Changes As Life Changes, was published in February 2014. Krasow's latest book is Camp Girls: Fireside Lessons on Friendship, Courage, and Loyalty. (2020).

== Biography ==
Krasnow has written for many national publications, including Parade, The Wall Street Journal, The Washington Post, AARP The Magazine, and The Huffington Post. She has been a guest on numerous national television and radio programs, including Oprah, Good Morning America, AARP, The Today Show, and All Things Considered, and she has been featured on CNN several times. For several years she was the relationship correspondent for the Fox Morning News in Baltimore. Interviews with Krasnow, and reviews of her work, have appeared in Time, O: The Oprah Magazine, Glamour, The New Yorker, The New York Times, U.S. News & World Report, and Redbook. Krasnow is a journalism and women's studies professor at American University in Washington, D.C. She frequently speaks on marriage, childrearing, and "female generational angst" to groups across the United States.

Krasnow lives in Annapolis, Maryland, with her husband, Charles E. Anthony, an architect, whom she married in 1988, and their four sons.

== Bibliography ==
- Surrendering to Motherhood: Losing Your Mind, Finding Your Soul (IBKBooks, 1998)
- Surrendering to Marriage: Husbands, Wives, and Other Imperfections (Miramax, 2001)
- I Am My Mother's Daughter: Making Peace With Mom – Before It's Too Late (Basic Books, 2007)
- The Secret Lives of Wives: Women Share What It Really Takes to Stay Married (Avery, 2012)
- Surrendering to Yourself: You Are Your Own Soul Mate (IBKBooks, 2013)
- Sex After . . .: Women Share How Intimacy Changes as Life Changes (Avery, 2015)
- Camp Girls: Fireside Lessons on Friendship, Courage, and Loyalty (Grand Central Publishing, 2020)
