= Najlah Feanny =

- Born: Najlah Feanny; 1961 (age 64–65); Kingston, Jamaica WI
- Known for: Photography
- Website: www.najlahfeanny.com

'Najlah Feanny (1961), or Najlah Feanny Hicks (born in Kingston, Jamaica) is an American photojournalist and former Newsweek Magazine contributor. Feanny covered politics, the American landscape, breaking news, feature stories, as well as documented stories in dozens of countries around the world. Feanny's images are represented by Corbis Images. She has set up projects and organizations to help vulnerable young people: the Heart Gallery of New Jersey, Do1Thing, and Design for Social GOOD.

== Projects ==
Feanny is the co-founder of the 'Heart Gallery of New Jersey' photography exhibition where she brought together 150 photographers to photograph children in foster care to promote their bid for adoption, photographing all 328 children who were legally eligible for adoption. ABC News recognized Heart Galleries in its "Person of the Week" article.

She founded Do1Thing, a project where photographers donated their time to make portraits of homeless teenagers who aged out of foster care, for a traveling exhibition to inspire people to adopt.

She is the founder and chief creative officer of Design for Social GOOD, an organization that uses design solutions to highlight social dilemmas.

== Selected group exhibitions ==
- 1994 – "Dan Eldon Exhibition Fundraiser," SABA Gallery, New York, NY.
- 1996 – French Culinary Institute Gallery, New York, NY.
- 2002 – "America 24/7", Nationwide traveling exhibit. 25,000 photographers submitted photographs in order to depict life from every U.S. State.
- 2005 – "Heart Gallery of New Jersey," Liberty Science Center, Jersey City, NJ.
- 2008 – "100 Waiting Children," New Jersey State House, Trenton, NJ; Princeton Library, Princeton, NJ; Princeton Historical Arts Society, Princeton, NJ; Liberty Science Center, Jersey City, NJ.
- 2009 – "Young Faces of Homelessness," by Do1Thing Parsons The New School for Design, New York, NY; ELCA National Youth Gathering, New Orleans, LA; Photo Expo, New York, NY; Salt Institute for Documentary Studies, Portland, ME.

== Awards and honors ==
- 2005: 'Person of the Week' from ABC News.
- 2008: Winner of the 2008 Russ Berrie Award for Making a Difference, $50,000 cash grant, from the Russell Berrie Foundation.

== Private collections ==
- William Jefferson Clinton President Presidential Library, Little Rock, Arkansas.

== Books with contributions ==
- Nigel Hamilton. Bill Clinton: An American Journey: Great Expectations. New York, NY: Random House, 2003. ISBN 0375506101.
- Rick Smolan and David Elliot Cohen. America 24/7. London: Dorling Kindersley, 2003. ISBN 0789499754.
- New Jersey 24/7. Dorling Kindersley, 2004. ISBN 0756600707.

== Education and academic career ==
Feanny holds a B.S. (1983) in Journalism from the University of Florida and an MFA (2009) in Design & Technology from Parsons, The New School for Design. After obtaining her MFA degree, she taught web design at Parsons, The New School for Design and York College, City University of New York. Currently, she is an adjunct assistant professor in the department of art and design at Montclair State University.

== Press coverage ==
- CBS News | Top Photogs Pitch In To Help Foster Kids
- CNN | The Heart Gallery and it's the brainchild of Najlah Feanny-Hicks and a few of her closest friends
- NBC News | Picture perfect adoption
- People | The Heart Gallery Love to Spare
- People | Wanted: a Home With Help from Top Photographers, Hard-to-Place Foster Kids Are Finding Their Way to Loving Families
- Plainfield Today | 'Heart Gallery' project touches Jerseyans' hearts
- Star Ledger | Hearting the Heart Gallery | NJ.com
- The New York Times | Show Them Your Best 'Take Me Home' Face
- Kelley, Tina (21 March 2005). "Show Them Your Best 'Take Me Home' Face". The New York Times.
