= Murder of Lee Harvey Oswald =

1963 murder by gunshot

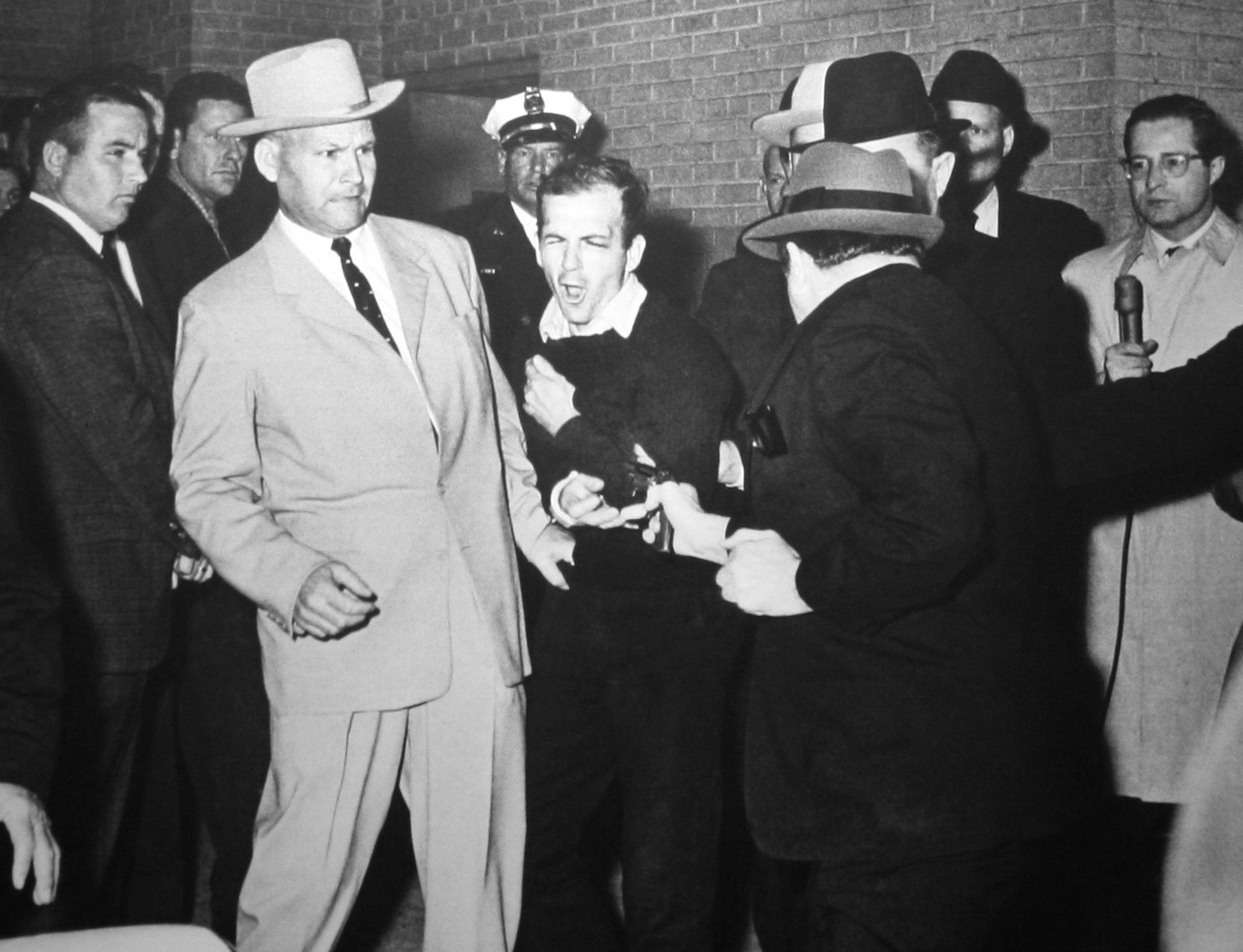
- Ruby shooting Oswald, who is being escorted by Dallas police. Detective Jim Leavelle is wearing the tan suit. This photograph won the 1964 Pulitzer Prize for Photography.
- Location: Dallas, Texas, U.S.
- Date: November 24, 1963; 62 years ago 11:21 a.m. (CST)
- Target: Lee Harvey Oswald
- Attack type: Murder by shooting
- Weapon: .38 caliber Colt Cobra revolver
- Deaths: 1
- Perpetrator: Jack Ruby
- Motive: Disputed: Retaliation for the Kennedy assassination, according to the Warren Commission; To silence Oswald, according to the House Select Committee on Assassinations
- Verdict: Guilty
- Convictions: Murder with malice
- Sentence: Death (overturned)

On November 24, 1963, at 11:21 a.m. CST, Lee Harvey Oswald, the man accused of assassinating US president John F. Kennedy two days earlier, was being escorted by Dallas police detectives Jim Leavelle and L. C. Graves through the police basement to an armored car that was to take Oswald to the nearby county jail when nightclub owner Jack Ruby, who was standing in a crowd of reporters, emerged with his revolver aimed at Oswald's abdomen, and shot and mortally wounded him.

Ruby later said he had been distraught over Kennedy's death and that his motive for killing Oswald was "saving Mrs. Kennedy the discomfiture of coming back to trial". In March 1964, Ruby was convicted and sentenced to death for Oswald's murder. The conviction was overturned on appeal in 1966, and Ruby was granted a new trial, but he fell ill, was diagnosed with cancer, and died of a pulmonary embolism on January 3, 1967. In 1964, the Warren Commission concluded that Ruby acted alone in the murder of Oswald and that there was no evidence Ruby was part of a conspiracy. Despite this, Ruby's killing of Oswald has stoked John F. Kennedy assassination conspiracy theories.

== Background ==
On Friday, November 22, 1963, John F. Kennedy, the 35th president of the United States, was assassinated while riding in a presidential motorcade through Dallas, Texas. Kennedy was in the vehicle with First Lady Jacqueline Kennedy, Texas governor John Connally, and Connally's wife Nellie, when he was fatally shot. Governor Connally was seriously wounded, and bystander James Tague received a minor facial injury from a small piece of curbstone that had fragmented after it was struck by one of the bullets. The motorcade rushed to Parkland Memorial Hospital, where Kennedy was declared dead at 1:00 PM. Kennedy was succeeded by Vice President Lyndon B. Johnson.

After a 6.5×52mm Carcano Model 38 rifle was found on the sixth floor of the Texas School Book Depository, depository worker Lee Harvey Oswald, a former U.S. Marine and American defector was arrested and charged by the Dallas Police Department for the assassination and for the murder of Dallas policeman J. D. Tippit, who was shot dead in a residential neighborhood in the Oak Cliff section of Dallas less than an hour after the assassination.

== Murder ==
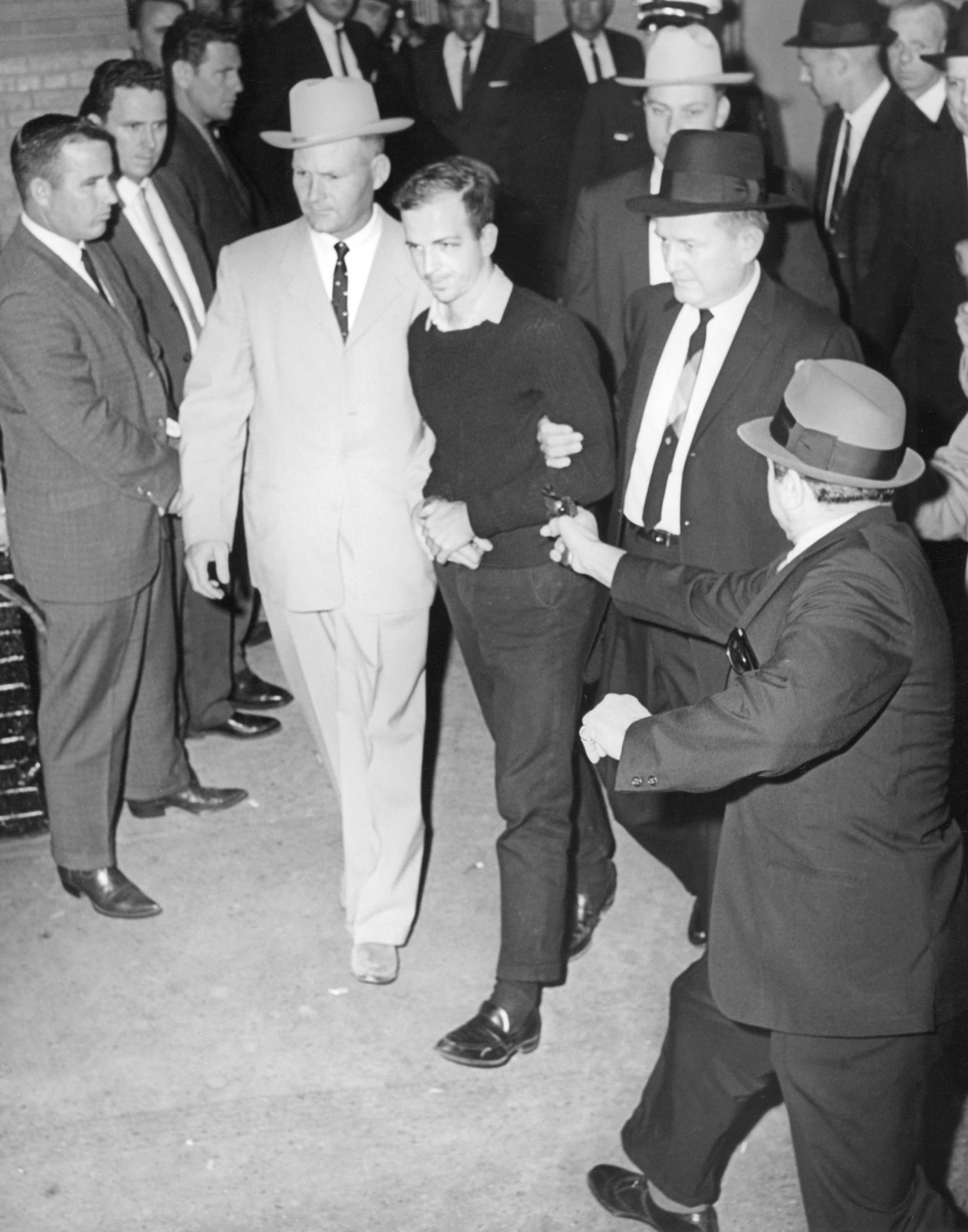
Jack Beers's photograph taken a split second before Jack Ruby shot Lee Harvey Oswald

On Sunday, November 24, as Oswald descended in the elevator to the basement, he was overheard by Ike Pappas, his last recorded words, stating, "I want to see the American Civil Liberties Union". At 11:21 am, as Oswald exited the elevator, and basement jail office, to be escorted to a car in the basement of Dallas Police headquarters for the transfer from the city jail to the county jail, when Ruby lunged forward. Ruby passed by William Harrison, who saw the gun and began to reach his hand out. Detective Billy Combest described Ruby's facial expression as that of a "determined look or grimace". Ruby fired a single shot into Oswald's abdomen at point-blank range, mortally wounding him.

Oswald screamed "Oh!" in pain and his hands clutched at his stomach, as he slumped to the floor, moaning. Immediately after the shot was fired, Graves grabbed for Ruby's gun, and Harrison grabbed Ruby's shoulder. As the armored car was rolling down the ramp the moment Ruby emerged, it slightly hit Ruby's leg, causing him to almost lose balance as he was immediately subdued by police. Combest exclaimed, "Jack, you son of a bitch!" Ruby and Oswald were both taken into the basement-level jail office. Ruby was handcuffed and taken up in the elevator.

The shooting was broadcast live on television. Robert H. Jackson of the Dallas Times Herald photographed the shooting; for the photograph, titled Jack Ruby Shoots Lee Harvey Oswald, he was awarded the 1964 Pulitzer Prize for Photography.

While Ruby was subdued by police, Oswald was carried back into the basement level jail office. Detective Billy Combest asked Oswald, "Do you have anything you want to tell us now?" Oswald shook his head.

Drifting in and out of consciousness, Oswald was placed in an ambulance and was driven to Parkland Memorial Hospital, the same hospital where Kennedy died two days earlier. Frederick Bieberdorf, a medical student on duty who rode in the ambulance, said that—several blocks before reaching the hospital—Oswald began thrashing about, and resisted Beiberdorf's efforts of heart massage and attempted to free an oxygen mask over his mouth. Lasped into a coma at Parkland, Oswald was treated by the same surgeons who had tried to save Kennedy. The bullet had entered his lower left chest and had not exited; major heart blood vessels such as the aorta and inferior vena cava were severed, and the spleen, kidney, and liver were hit. Despite surgical intervention and defibrillation, Oswald suffered a cardiac arrest and died at 1:07 pm. Oswald was placed in an ambulance and driven to Parkland Memorial Hospital, the same hospital where President Kennedy had died two days earlier. Parkland surgeons subsequently determined Ruby's bullet had entered Oswald's left side in the front part of the abdomen and caused extensive damage to his spleen, stomach, aorta, vena cava, kidney, liver, diaphragm, and eleventh rib before coming to rest on his right side. Oswald died at 1:07 p.m.

Arrested immediately after the shooting, Ruby testified to the Warren Commission that he had been distraught by Kennedy's death and that killing Oswald would spare "Mrs. Kennedy the discomfiture of coming back to trial". He also stated he shot Oswald on the spur of the moment when the opportunity presented itself, without considering any reason for doing so. Initially, Ruby wished to represent himself in his trial until his lawyer Melvin Belli dissuaded him: Belli argued that Ruby had an episode of psychomotor epilepsy and was thus not responsible. Ruby was convicted, but the decision was overturned on appeal. While awaiting retrial in 1967, Ruby died of a pulmonary embolism, secondary to cancer at Parkland Hospital.

== Legal proceedings ==
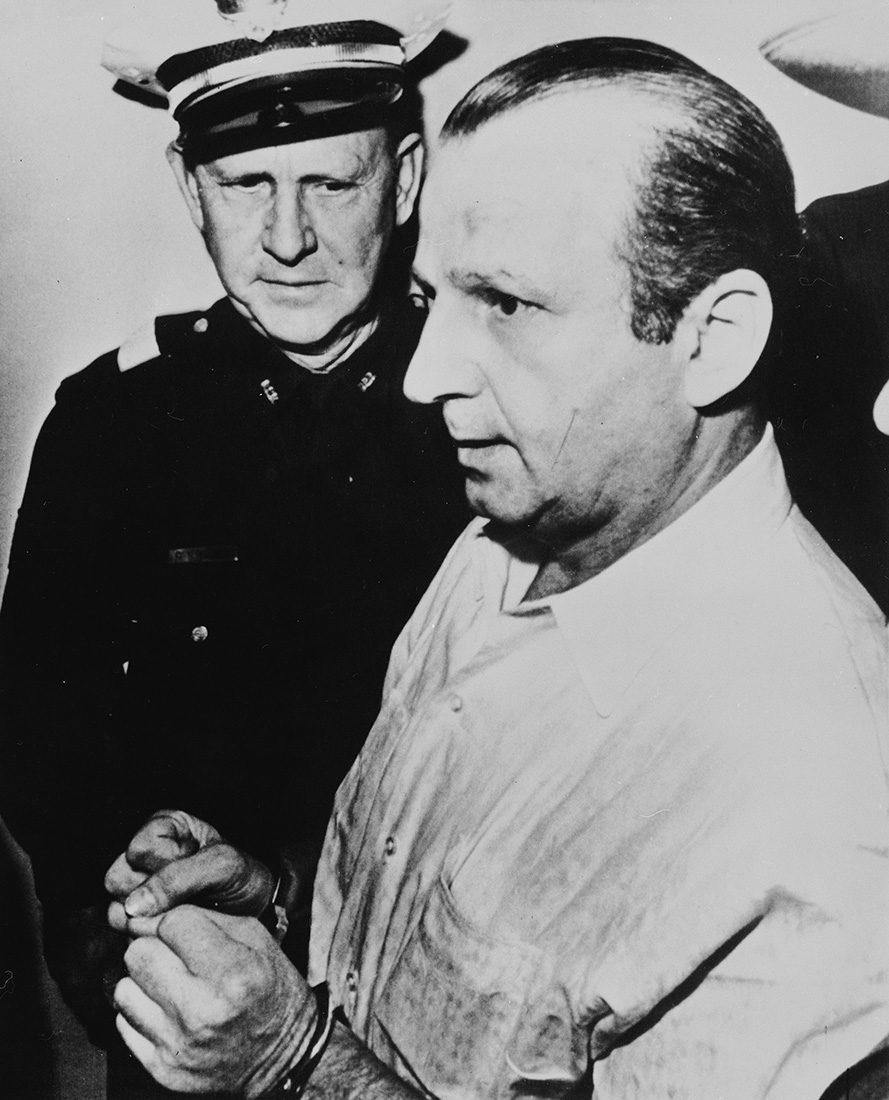
Ruby after his arrest

After his arrest, Ruby said that he had been distraught over Kennedy's death, had wanted to help the city of Dallas "redeem" itself in the eyes of the public, and that he was "saving Mrs. Kennedy the discomfiture of coming back to trial". He also claimed that he shot Oswald on the spur of the moment when the opportunity presented itself, without considering any reason for doing so. Ruby said that he was an admirer of the Kennedy family, that he cried when he heard that Kennedy was shot, was "in mourning" after, "cried a great deal" Saturday afternoon, and was depressed that night. The grief over the assassination, Ruby stated, finally "reached the point of insanity," suddenly compelling him to shoot when Oswald walked in front of him in the basement that Sunday morning.

At the time of the shooting, Ruby said that he was taking phenmetrazine (Preludin), a central nervous system stimulant. Ruby also said that he entered the police basement by coming down the Main Street ramp. Later, Ruby expressed remorse to his brother Earl, saying he never wanted Oswald to die. Ruby asked Dallas attorney Tom Howard to represent him. Howard accepted and asked Ruby if he could think of anything that might damage his defense. Ruby responded that there would be a problem if a man by the name of "Davis" should come up. Ruby told his attorney that he "had been involved with Davis, who was a gunrunner entangled in anti-Castro efforts."

Ruby's brother Earl replaced Howard with prominent San Francisco defense attorney Melvin Belli, who agreed to represent him pro bono. Lawyer Joe H. Tonahill also signed on to assist with Ruby's defense. At his bond hearing in January 1964, while talking to reporters, Ruby tearfully said, regarding the assassination of Kennedy, that he could not understand "how a great man like that could be lost." Belli tried to argue that Ruby was mentally ill and employed the insanity defense. He told the press that "Ruby is an intense, emotional man. Talking to him, the hair rose on the hackles of my neck. I felt horror, revulsion, sadness". Ruby was uncomfortable with Belli's defense strategy, which included Ruby not testifying at all during the trial. Ruby said he would have liked to testify but that "Mr. Belli knows better, I guess".

Ruby stated that he thought he said, "You killed my President, you rat!" as he shot Oswald. Officer McMillon testified he heard Ruby say, "You rat son of a bitch, you shot the president". This was disputed by footage showing McMillon looking in the opposite direction from the shooting. Dallas police sergeant Patrick Dean testified that when Ruby was arrested, Ruby said he thought about killing Oswald two nights earlier to show the world that "Jews have guts." Detective Don Archer said Ruby had told him he intended to shoot Oswald three times, and McMillon corroborated this.

On March 14, 1964, Ruby was convicted of murder with malice and was sentenced to death. Belli was fired by Ruby and his family as a result. Ruby requested that Percy Foreman represent him, although this arrangement lasted only a few days before Foreman quit over disagreements on legal strategy with Ruby's family. He was replaced by Hubert Winston Smith. Ruby's conviction was overturned by the Texas Court of Criminal Appeals on the grounds that "an oral confession of premeditation made while in police custody" should have been ruled inadmissible because it violated a Texas criminal statute. The court also ruled that the venue should have been changed to a Texas county other than the one in which the high-profile crime had been committed.

During the six months following the assassination, Ruby repeatedly asked to speak to the members of the Warren Commission. The Commission initially showed no interest, but Ruby's sister Eileen wrote letters to the Commission and her letters became public. The Commission finally agreed to talk to Ruby. In June 1964, Chief Justice Earl Warren, Representative (and future President) Gerald R. Ford of Michigan, and other Commission members went to Dallas to see Ruby.

Ruby asked Warren several times to take him to Washington D.C., saying that "my life is in danger here" and that he wanted an opportunity to make additional statements. He added: "I want to tell the truth, and I can't tell it here." Ruby said that the people from whom he felt himself to be in danger were the John Birch Society of Dallas, including Edwin Walker, who he claimed were trying to falsely implicate him as being involved in a conspiracy to assassinate the President. Warren told Ruby that he would be unable to comply with his request because many legal barriers would need to be overcome, and public interest in the situation would be too heavy. Warren also told Ruby that the Commission would have no way of protecting him since it had no police powers. Ruby said that he wanted to convince President Lyndon Johnson that he was not part of any conspiracy to kill Kennedy.

Eventually, the appellate court agreed with Ruby's lawyers that he should be granted a new trial. On October 5, 1966, the court ruled that his motion for a change of venue before the original trial court should have been granted. Ruby's conviction and death sentence were overturned.

Arrangements were underway for a new trial to be held in February 1967 in Wichita Falls, Texas, but Ruby was admitted to Parkland Hospital on December 9, 1966, suffering from pneumonia, where he was diagnosed with cancer in his liver, lungs, and brain. His condition rapidly deteriorated. An armed guard was placed outside his room, but family and friends were allowed to visit. On December 16, Earl Ruby, accompanied by one of his brother's lawyers, smuggled a tape recorder hidden in a briefcase into Jack's room to record an interview about his murder of Oswald. Ruby maintained that he entered the basement by coming down the ramp, had killed Oswald out of grief over the assassination, and denied knowing Oswald prior. According to an unnamed Associated Press source, Ruby made a final statement from his hospital bed on December 19 that he had acted alone. "There is nothing to hide," Ruby said, "there was no one else."

== Burial of Oswald ==
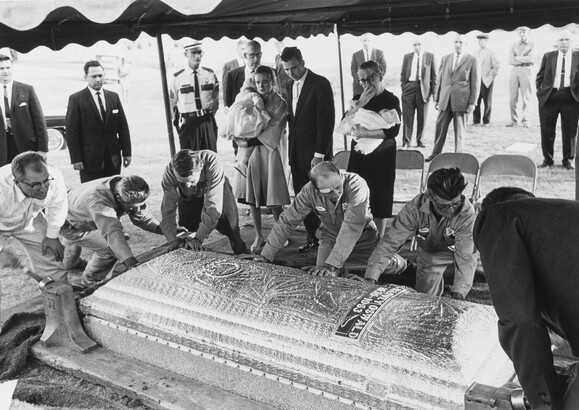
Oswald burial with Marina Oswald and child in attendance on November 25, 1963, at Rose Hill Cemetery in Ft. Worth

Miller Funeral Home had great difficulty finding a cemetery willing to accept Oswald's remains; Rose Hill Cemetery in Fort Worth eventually agreed. A Lutheran minister reluctantly agreed to officiate but then failed to appear. Reverend Louis Saunders of the Fort Worth Council of Churches volunteered, saying that "someone had to help this family". He performed a brief graveside service under heavy guard on November 25. Reporters covering the burial were asked to act as pallbearers.

Oswald's original marker, with his full name, birth date, and death date, was stolen four years after the assassination. His mother replaced it with a marker simply inscribed Oswald. The stolen marker was later found. His mother's body was buried beside his in 1981. A claim by Michael Eddowes in The Oswald File (1975) that a look-alike Russian agent was buried in place of Oswald led to the body's exhumation on October 4, 1981. Dental records confirmed it was Oswald. The remains were reburied in a new coffin because of extensive water damage to the original.

In 2010, Miller Funeral Home employed a Los Angeles auction house to sell the original mole-skin covered pine coffin to an anonymous bidder for $87,468. The sale was halted after Oswald's brother, Robert (1934–2017), sued to reclaim the coffin. In 2015, a district judge in Tarrant County, Texas, ruled that the funeral home intentionally concealed the existence of the coffin from Robert Oswald, who had originally purchased it and believed that it had been discarded after the exhumation, and ordered it returned to Robert Oswald along with damages equal to the sale price. Robert Oswald's attorney stated that the coffin would likely be destroyed "as soon as possible".

== Investigations ==
=== Warren Commission ===
The Warren Commission found no evidence linking Ruby's killing of Oswald with any broader conspiracy to assassinate Kennedy. The Warren Report provided a detailed biography of Ruby's life and activities to help ascertain whether he was involved in a conspiracy to assassinate Kennedy. The Warren Commission also investigated rumors that Ruby and Oswald knew each other and that Oswald was seen at Ruby's Carousel Club. (Note: Television footage showed Oswald briefly glancing in Ruby's direction as Ruby emerged to shoot him, compounding suspicions. Analysis of the footage indicates that Oswald may have been looking at reporter Ike Pappas, who had held his microphone out toward Oswald and who asked, "Do you have anything to say in your defense?") The Warren Commission concluded that various witnesses linking Ruby and Oswald lacked credibility and that there was no solid evidence to link the two men. The Commission indicated that there was not a "significant link between Ruby and organized crime" and said Ruby acted independently in killing Oswald.

The Warren Commission noted testimony indicating Ruby entered the basement of the headquarters just as Oswald was being transferred, and that Ruby's shooting of Oswald was a spontaneous, unplanned act. Ruby drove into town with his pet dachshund, Sheba, to send an emergency money order at the Western Union on Main Street to one of his employees. The time stamp was 11:17 a.m. for the transaction. Ruby then walked half a block to the Dallas police headquarters, where he made his way into the basement. Warren Commission investigator David Belin said that postal inspector Harry Holmes arrived unannounced at the Dallas police station on the morning that Ruby shot Oswald and, upon invitation by the investigators, had questioned Oswald, thus delaying his transfer by half an hour. Belin noted that, had Ruby been part of a conspiracy, he would have been downtown 30 minutes earlier, when Oswald had been scheduled to be transferred. The Commission accepted Ruby's claim that he entered the police basement via the Main Street ramp. Warren Report supporters have questioned why Ruby would have left his beloved dog in his car if his killing of Oswald had been planned.

Some of Ruby's friends, relatives (notably his brother Earl and sister Eva), and associates, expressed belief that Ruby acted alone, maintaining that he was upset over Kennedy's death, crying on occasions, and closing his clubs as a mark of respect. They rejected conspiracy theorists' claims, saying that Ruby's connection with gangsters was minimal at most and that he was not the sort of person who would be entrusted to be part of a conspiracy.

Dallas reporter Tony Zoppi, who knew Ruby well, claimed that one "would have to be crazy" to entrust Ruby with anything as important as a high-level plot to kill Kennedy since he "couldn't keep a secret for five minutes ... Jack was one of the most talkative guys you would ever meet. He'd be the worst fellow in the world to be part of a conspiracy, because he just plain talked too much." He and others described Ruby as the sort who enjoyed being at "the center of attention", trying to make friends with people and being more of a nuisance.

Some writers, including former Los Angeles District Attorney Vincent Bugliosi, dismiss Ruby's connections to organized crime as being highly minimal: "It is very noteworthy that without exception, not one of these conspiracy theorists knew or had ever met Jack Ruby. Without our even resorting to his family and roommate, all of whom think the suggestion of Ruby being connected to the mob is ridiculous, those who knew him, unanimously and without exception, think the notion of his being connected to the Mafia, and then killing Oswald for them, is nothing short of laughable."

Bill Alexander, who prosecuted Ruby for Oswald's murder, equally rejected any suggestions that Ruby was involved with organized crime, claiming that conspiracy theorists based it on the claim that "A knew B, and Ruby knew B back in 1950, so he must have known A, and that must be the link to the conspiracy."

Ruby's brother Earl denied allegations that Jack was involved in racketeering at Chicago nightclubs, and author Gerald Posner suggested in his book Case Closed: Lee Harvey Oswald and the Assassination of JFK that witnesses may have confused Ruby with Harry Rubenstein, a convicted Chicago felon. Zoppi was also dismissive of mob ties and described Ruby as a "born loser".

== Conspiracy theories ==
Author Mark Lane's 1966 work Rush to Judgment popularized the general dissenting theory that the Warren Commission's approach was flawed ("covered itself with shame"); that Oswald likely wasn't responsible, and that the witnesses who reported hearing shots fired from a nearby "grassy knoll" credibly cast doubt on Oswald acting alone. Lane was briefly retained as counsel for Oswald's mother.

A Gallup poll taken in mid-November 2013, showed 61% believed that Kennedy was killed as a result of conspiracy, and only 30% thought Oswald acted alone. Oswald was never prosecuted because he was murdered two days after the assassination. In March 1967, New Orleans District Attorney Jim Garrison arrested and charged New Orleans businessman Clay Shaw with conspiring to assassinate President Kennedy, with the help of Oswald, David Ferrie, and others. Garrison believed that the men were part of an arms smuggling ring supplying weapons to the anti-Castro Cubans in a conspiracy with elements of the CIA to kill Kennedy. The trial of Clay Shaw began in January 1969 in Orleans Parish Criminal Court. The jury acquitted Shaw.

Several films have fictionalized a trial of Oswald, depicting what might have happened had Ruby not killed Oswald, including The Trial of Lee Harvey Oswald (1964), The Trial of Lee Harvey Oswald (1977), and On Trial: Lee Harvey Oswald (1986). The 1986 docu-trial was a 21-hour unscripted mock trial on television, argued by lawyers before a judge, with unscripted testimony from surviving witnesses to the events surrounding the assassination; it was aired again in 1988 including additional courtroom footage not included in the original 1986 Showtime/MPI version. The jury returned a verdict of guilty and inspired Vincent Bugliosi, who in 2005 described the 1986 mock trial as "the closest thing to a trial that Lee Harvey Oswald ever had or will have to write", to write his "Oswald acted alone" magnum opus Reclaiming History (2007). In 1992, the American Bar Association conducted two mock Oswald trials: the first trial ended in a hung jury, while the second trial saw the jury acquitting Oswald.

Journalist Jefferson Morley has written extensively in his blog, JFK Facts, on the nature of Oswald's relationship with James Angleton. In a March 2025 interview with the Washington Post, Morley shared the following:

"I'm not saying that [Angleton] was the mastermind of the assassination. But he was the mastermind behind Oswald," Morley said Thursday night during his open Zoom call. "The failure of Angleton to intercept or do anything about Oswald at the same time that he's running operations around him — that combination, yes — that tells me Angleton played a complicit role in Kennedy's assassination."

== Reactions ==
A network television pool camera was broadcasting live to cover Oswald's transfer; millions of people watching on NBC saw the shooting as it happened, and in a matter of minutes it was on other networks. Several photographs were taken of the event, capturing the moments when Ruby pulled the trigger. In 1964, Robert H. Jackson of the Dallas Times Herald was awarded the Pulitzer Prize for Photography for his image, titled Jack Ruby Shoots Lee Harvey Oswald.

Great indignation was directed towards Ruby's murder of Oswald. Many felt that the killing had robbed the nation of essential information and left questions unanswered. When asked, former vice president Richard Nixon said, "The man who was guilty of murdering the President of the United States deserved to die, but under our legal system, he was also entitled to a trial [...] two wrongs don't make a right." Oswald's murder compounded suspicions that the Kennedy assassination was part of a larger plot.

Not all were shocked, however. The crowd outside the headquarters applauded when they heard that Oswald had been shot. In Dallas and elsewhere in the nation, Oswald was hated in death, and Ruby was viewed as a hero by some citizens. During his time in jail, he received many letters from the public, often praising him for his actions.

== Sources ==
- "Appendix 16: A Biography of Jack Ruby". Report of the President's Commission on the Assassination of President John F. Kennedy. Washington, DC: United States Government Printing Office. 1964. p. 786. Archived from the original on April 8, 2020.
