= Jim Leavelle =

American police detective (1920–2019)

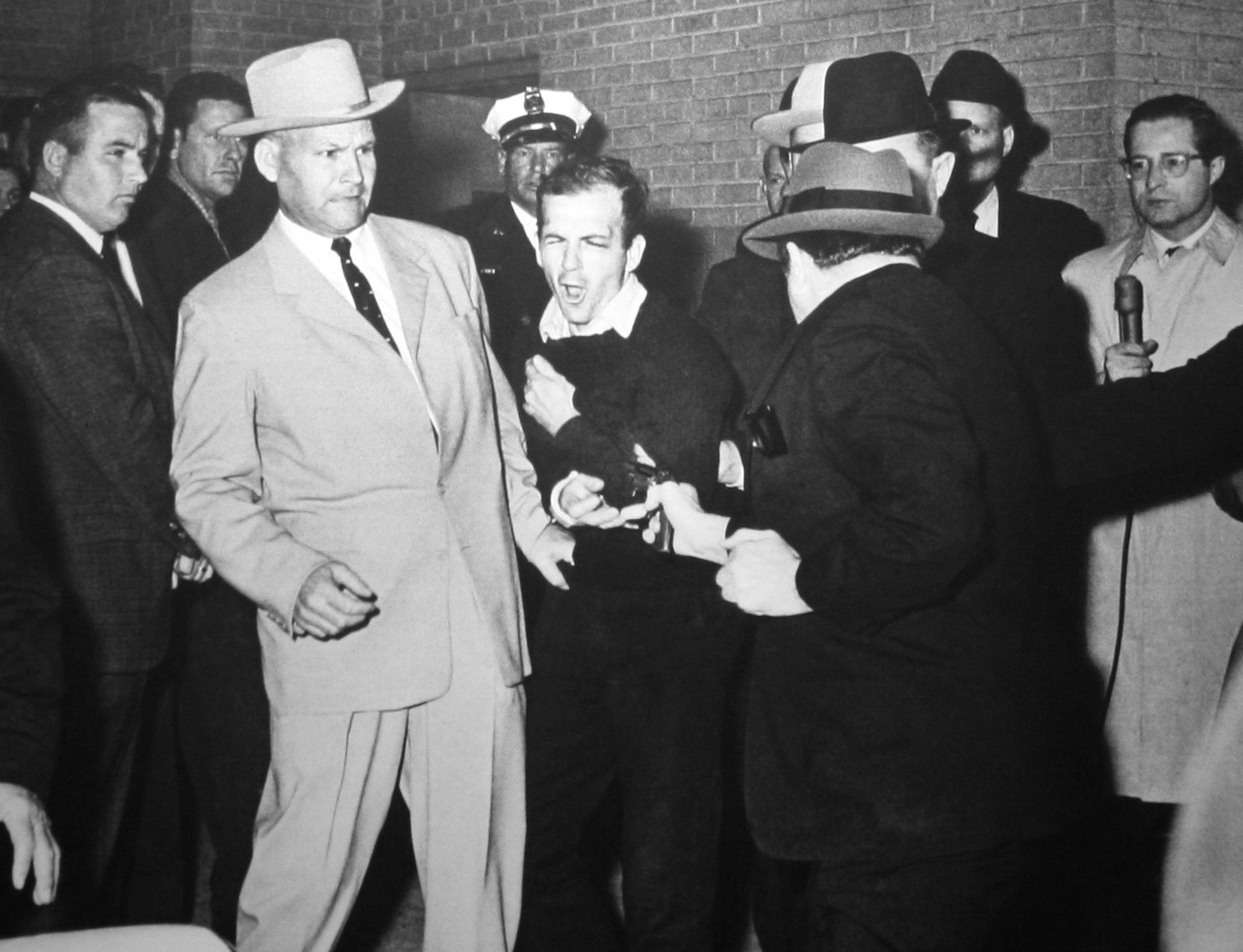
- Leavelle (in light suit) reacts as Jack Ruby shoots Lee Harvey Oswald (photograph by Robert H. Jackson)
- Born: James Robert Leavelle; August 23, 1920; Red River County, Texas, U.S.
- Died: August 29, 2019 (aged 99); Denver, Colorado, U.S.
- Occupation: Detective
- Spouse: Taimi Sanelma Trast (died 2014)
- Children: 2
- Military career
- Allegiance: United States
- Branch: United States Navy
- Service years: 1939–1942
- Conflicts: World War II: Attack on Pearl Harbor

James Robert Leavelle (August 23, 1920 – August 29, 2019) was a Dallas Police Department homicide detective who, on November 24, 1963, was escorting Lee Harvey Oswald through the basement of Dallas Police headquarters when Oswald was fatally shot by Jack Ruby. Leavelle prominently appeared in films and photographs of the murder, including one that won a Pulitzer Prize—taken just as Ruby shot Oswald.

== Early life and military service ==
James Robert Leavelle was born on August 23, 1920, in Red River County, Texas. In 1937, he joined the Civilian Conservation Corps. Following his high school graduation, in 1939, Leavelle enlisted into the United States Navy. He briefly served on the destroyer USS Hammann (DD-412) as she did plane-guard duty with the carrier USS Enterprise (CV-6). In the spring of 1941, Leavelle reported to the destroyer tender USS Whitney (AD-4) as a storekeeper.

During the attack on Pearl Harbor, on December 7, 1941, Leavelle was on deck aboard the USS Whitney. When Ford Island was struck, Leavelle hurried to his battle station. He recalled several decades later, "We were surprised, of course, and awed by the attack and watching the carnage that was taking place."

In April 1942, the Whitney left Pearl Harbor and headed for the South Pacific Ocean to support operations there. One day, while the ship was caught in a storm, Leavelle was descending a ladder when a large wave knocked him down the deck. The impact seriously damaged his knees, and he was evacuated to Oak Knoll Naval Hospital near Oakland, California. In the hospital, he met nurse Taimi Sanelma Trast, his future wife. Around the same time, Leavelle left on a medical discharge to take a civilian supply job with the Army Air Force in Southern California.

== Police career ==
After World War II ended, Leavelle worked as an auditor for the Veterans Administration until 1950. In April 1950, Leavelle joined the Dallas Police Department as a homicide detective and retired in April 1975.

== November 1963 and aftermath ==
On the morning of November 22, 1963, Leavelle and another patrolman arrested a suspect for armed robbery in North Dallas. They transported the suspect to the city jail and when they reached the third floor, Leavelle learned that U.S. President John F. Kennedy had been shot. Leavelle arrived at the Texas School Book Depository, where other detectives were investigating the crime scene. He then arrived at the crime scene in Oak Cliff, where Dallas police officer J. D. Tippit had been shot.

Lee Harvey Oswald was arrested at the Texas Theatre for Tippit's murder. Elsewhere, Leavelle instructed the dispatcher to have Oswald taken to his office for interrogation. Oswald was brought to the Dallas Police Headquarters, where Leavelle told Tippit murder witnesses Ted Callaway and Sam Guinyard while they were waiting to view Oswald in a line-up: "We want to be sure, we want to try to wrap him up real tight on killing this officer. We think he is the same one that shot the President. But if we can wrap him up tight on killing this officer, we have got him."

After Oswald had been identified, Leavelle was the first to interrogate him. Leavelle asked Oswald if he had shot Tippit, to which Oswald replied, "I didn't shoot anybody." Before Leavelle could continue his line of questioning, J. W. Fritz, the captain of the Dallas Police Homicide and Robbery Bureau, entered the interrogation room and identified Oswald was the prime suspect for the assassination of U.S. President John F. Kennedy. Leavelle stated, "They took him to Capt. Fritz's office ... so I never did any more questioning of him."

On November 24, at 11:21 a.m. CST, Oswald was handcuffed between Leavelle and fellow detective L. C. Graves as he was being led through the basement of the Dallas Police Headquarters to an armored car that was to take him from the city jail to the county jail. Jack Ruby emerged from the crowd and shot and mortally wounded Oswald at point-blank range. Leavelle stated that when Ruby fired and Oswald screamed and slumped to the floor, "I had to go down with him because I was handcuffed to him. Police Officer Graves had grabbed his gun and was wrestling the gun away from him." Leavelle and Graves carried Oswald into the basement level jail office where Oswald was attended by Frederick Bieberdorf, a medical student on duty. Oswald was placed onto an ambulance to be driven to Parkland Memorial Hospital, the same hospital where President Kennedy had died two days earlier. Leavelle and Graves, along with Bieberdorf, rode in the ambulance.

Robert N. McClelland, who treated Kennedy and Oswald at Parkland Hospital, said that while at Parkland, Leavelle, who was waiting outside the hospital room, told him that after Oswald was shot, he claimed to have "leaned over Oswald and said, 'Son, you're hurt real bad. Do you wanna say anything?' He looked at me for a second. He waited like he was thinking. Then he shook his head back and forth just as wide as he could. Then he closed his eyes." Leavelle refuted the claim. Oswald died at 1:07 p.m. at Parkland Hospital. The morning after Oswald was shot, Leavelle transferred Ruby to the county jail on November 25.

Leavelle took a statement from Texas School Book Depository employee Victoria Adams on February 17, 1964. Adams had only moved into an apartment the day before Leavelle knocked on her door, and she had not yet notified anyone with a change of address. When asked why he needed to talk with her since she had already given her testimony to the Dallas Police, he responded, "Oh, the records were all burned in a fire we had and we have to interview everyone again." No evidence of a fire at the DPD has been uncovered. When asked by researcher Barry Ernest, Leavelle told him that it was during preparations for Ruby's trial.

On March 25, 1964, Leavelle provided testimony to Warren Commission assistant counsel Leon Hubert. He provided additional testimony to assistant counsel Joseph Ball on April 7. Leavelle testified that, "at the time, I didn't realize there was any connection between Oswald and the shooting of Tippit or the one that they had arrested in the Texas Theatre for the killing of Tippit and the Presidential assassination. I thought it was two different things altogether. So, I proceeded back to the office to work on that end of it, checking with the captain, and they was tied up with the Presidential assassination, and not until we got there did I realize some few minutes later on, when talking to some of the people of the Texas Book Depository, did we realize Oswald could very well be the same one who assassinated the President." He also noted that it was not normal procedure for police officers to join in on line-ups. Leavelle thought that other prisoners would harm Oswald.

Leavelle testified that the first time he had ever sat in on an interrogation with Oswald was on November 24, 1963. When Ball asked Leavelle if he had ever spoken to Oswald before this interrogation, he stated, "No, I had never talked to him before". Leavelle then stated during his testimony that "the only time I had connections with Oswald was this Sunday morning [November 24, 1963]. I never had [the] occasion... to talk with him at any time..." He used "I do not recall" thirty times in two testimony sessions and "I don't remember" nine times, in regards to the events of November 1963.

He also recalled Oswald protesting about the line-up with him in a T-shirt, stating that "he was raising Cain about being up there with a T-shirt and wouldn't be quiet...He said it wasn't fair...he went on all the time." When Ball asked, "You took part in the investigation, did you not, as a member of the Dallas Police Department?", Leavelle replied, "A minor part you might say. I didn't have much to do with Oswald, myself."

The tan suit that Leavelle wore on November 24, 1963, is on display at the Sixth Floor Museum.

Leavelle supported the official conclusion that Oswald acted alone and rejected conspiracy theories surrounding the assassination.

== Later life and death ==
In later interviews, Leavelle said that he interrogated Oswald regarding the Tippit murder on November 22. He said that he joked with Oswald before the transfer, saying "Lee, if anybody shoots at you, I hope they're as good a shot as you are," meaning that the person would hit Oswald instead of Leavelle. Oswald smiled and said, "You're being melodramatic. Nobody's going to shoot at me."

He was interviewed for the 1988 documentary The Men Who Killed Kennedy and also for the 1992 documentary The JFK Assassination: The Jim Garrison Tapes. In December 1992, while demonstrating at his home in Garland, Texas, how L. C. Graves grabbed Ruby's gun in an attempt to stop him from firing, Leavelle accidentally shot researcher and photographer Bob Porter in the arm, using the same model gun Ruby had used. Porter recovered at Parkland Hospital. The character of "Leavelle" in season 10 episode 9 of The Simpsons, "Mayored to the Mob" (1998), is based on Jim Leavelle, as he appeared when escorting Lee Harvey Oswald when Oswald was shot by Ruby. Leavelle trains the bodyguards by pretending to shoot their protectee from a grassy knoll on a cart. This is a reference to the grassy knoll at the site of President John F. Kennedy’s assassination, Dealey Plaza and a scene from the Kennedy assassination film Executive Action (1973).

In an interview with author Joseph McBride, Leavelle said in regards to how his department had reacted to the president's assassination, "...as the old saying goes back then, 'it was no different than a south Dallas nigger killing'. When you get right down to it – because it was just another murder inside the city limits of Dallas that we could handle. It was just another murder to me. I've handled hundreds of them. So it wasn't no big deal." Leavelle said in regards to the death of Tippit, "What some people don't realize is that when a police officer gets killed, that takes precedence over the shooting of the president, because that's close to home."

In November 2011, Leavelle lost an eye after a serious fall, after which he wore a glass eye.

In 2013, the Dallas Police Department's Detective of the Year Award was named in Leavelle's honor.

Leavelle's wife Taimi died on October 1, 2014. On August 29, 2019, Leavelle died from a heart attack following hip surgery at the age of 99.
