= Rubenstein v. State =

Texas Court of Criminal Appeals case

Rubenstein v. Texas
- Court: Texas Court of Criminal Appeals
- Full case name: Jack Rubenstein alias Jack Ruby v. State
- Decided: October 5, 1966
- Citation: 407 S.W.2d 793 (1966)

Case history
- Prior actions: Ruby convicted and sentenced to death
- Subsequent actions: Conviction overturned and new trial ordered; Ruby died before he could be retried

Court membership
- Judges sitting: Morrison, Presiding Judge; McDonald, Woodley, Associate Judges

Case opinions
- Unanimous Decision

Jacob Rubenstein v. State of Texas 407 S.W.2d 793 (1966) was a decision by the Texas Court of Criminal Appeals, the highest criminal appellate court in the State of Texas, that Jack Ruby, real name Jacob Rubenstein, the killer of Lee Harvey Oswald, had been denied a fair trial. The decision ordered his conviction reversed. Ruby died before he could be retried.

== The crime ==
The arrest of Lee Harvey Oswald for the murder of President John F. Kennedy and Dallas police officer J. D. Tippit was widely televised in Dallas. News of Oswald's transfer, from the local jail to a county facility, on Sunday November 24, 1963, had been announced the night before. At 11:21 am CST, authorities were preparing to transfer Oswald by car from the basement of police headquarters to the nearby county jail.

Ruby, in full view of witnesses and in front of TV cameras, pulled out a pistol and fired a snub-nosed Colt Cobra .38 into the 24-year-old Oswald's abdomen. Unconscious, Oswald was put into an ambulance and rushed to Parkland Memorial Hospital, the same hospital where doctors tried to save the life of John F. Kennedy two days earlier. Oswald died at 1:07 pm.

== The trial ==
The trial was widely covered by local, national and international media. Henry Wade was the prosecutor. The defendant, represented pro bono by famed attorney Melvin Belli, requested that the trial be moved out of the Dallas area because of the enormous publicity. This request was denied.

Some observers thought that the case could have been disposed of as a "murder without malice" charge, roughly equivalent to manslaughter, with a maximum prison sentence of five years. Instead, Belli attempted to prove that Ruby was legally insane and had a history of mental illness in his family, as his mother had been committed to a mental hospital years before.

On March 14, 1964, Ruby was convicted of murder with malice, for which he received a death sentence. The verdict was captured on film, including Belli's statement to the court that the trial had effectively been a sham.

== The appeal ==
Following Ruby's March 1964 conviction for murder with malice, Ruby's lawyers appealed, led by Sam Houston Clinton, arguing that he could not have received a fair trial in Dallas because of the excessive publicity surrounding the case.

== The decision ==
The Texas Court of Criminal Appeals ruled in a unanimous opinion on October 5, 1966, that Ruby's jailhouse confession was improperly admitted into evidence at trial and that the trial court erred in refusing to grant the motion for change of venue. The appellate court overturned Ruby's conviction and death sentence, and ordered that he be retried in some location other than Dallas County.

Arrangements were under way for a new trial to be held in February 1967, in Wichita Falls, Texas. On December 9, 1966, Ruby was admitted to Parkland Hospital in Dallas, suffering from pneumonia. A day later, doctors realized he had cancer in his liver, lungs, and brain. He died on January 3, 1967.

== Aftermath ==
Due to the prominence of the case, in 2015 Tarrant County authorities chose to keep the paper court documents of the case as historical documents even though they have been digitized. The Tarrant County files involve the state trying to ban Belli from being Ruby's lawyer.
