= Ike Pappas =

American journalist

Icarus Nestor Pappas (April 16, 1933 – August 31, 2008), better known as Ike Pappas, was an American television journalist who worked as a CBS News correspondent for 25 years.

== Life and career ==
Pappas was born in the Flushing, Queens, section of New York City. He graduated from Long Island University and then spent two years in the United States Army. He was assigned to Stars and Stripes during his enlistment.

=== Dallas, Texas, November 24, 1963 ===
That morning, Pappas was among the throng of reporters present at the Dallas City Jail for presidential assassin Lee Harvey Oswald's transfer to the County Jail. Working for WNEW-AM in New York at the time, Pappas began his report as Oswald came into view:

Now the prisoner, wearing a black sweater, he's changed from his T-shirt, is being moved out toward an armored car. Being led out by Captain Fritz." (car horn sounds) "There's the prisoner." (Pappas holds his microphone out towards Oswald) "Do you have anything to say in your defense...

As Pappas asked Oswald the question, Jack Ruby stepped out of the crowd of reporters with a pistol, moved in front of Oswald and fired one shot into Oswald's abdomen.

There's a shot! Oswald has been shot! Oswald has been shot! A shot rang out. Mass confusion here, all the doors have been locked. Holy mackerel!

Pappas later testified in Ruby's trial. He served as the narrator for the 1992 documentary Beyond 'JFK': The Question of Conspiracy.

=== Later years ===
In May 1970, Pappas was at Kent State University with a CBS News film crew when members of the Ohio National Guard shot four students during an antiwar protest.

Pappas was the most prominent of 215 people laid off in 1987 during a downsizing at CBS News.

Along with a number of other notable Greek Americans, he was a founding member of The Next Generation Initiative, a leadership program aimed at getting students involved in public affairs.

After he left CBS, Pappas formed his own television production company with CBS News Editor Ed Danko, and made cameo appearances as himself in several motion pictures, including The Package and Moon Over Parador.

A resident of McLean, Virginia, in his later years, he died in Arlington, Virginia, of congestive heart failure, aged 75.
