= Jack Ruby =

American nightclub owner and murderer of Lee Harvey Oswald (1911–1967)

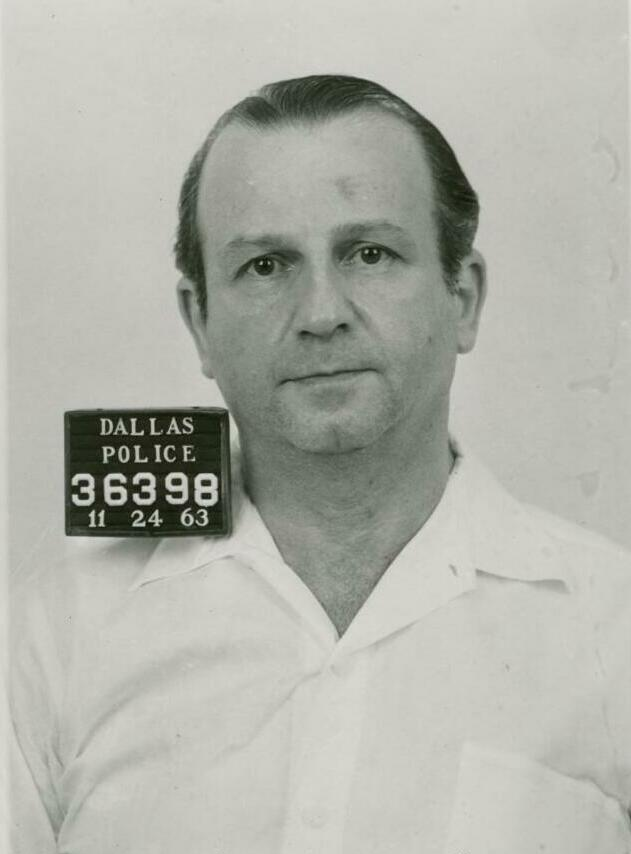
- Mug shot of Ruby taken on November 24, 1963
- Born: Jacob Rubenstein c. (Note: Birth records were not officially kept in Chicago prior to 1915, and among school records, driver's licenses, and arrest records, there were six different dates, ranging from March to June 1911.) (Note: The Warren Commission found that various dates were given in the records for Ruby's birth; the one most used by Ruby himself was March 25, 1911. His grave marker has April 25, 1911, as his birthdate.) March 25, 1911; Chicago, Illinois, U.S.
- Died: January 3, 1967 (aged 55); Dallas, Texas, U.S.
- Burial place: Westlawn Cemetery
- Known for: Murder of Lee Harvey Oswald
- Criminal charge: Murder with malice
- Criminal information
- Occupation: Nightclub owner
- Status: Conviction overturned on appeal, died before retrial
- Penalty: Death (overturned)

Details
- Victims: Lee Harvey Oswald
- Killed: 1

Jack Leon Ruby (born Jacob Rubenstein; c. March 25, 1911 – January 3, 1967) was an American nightclub owner. He murdered Lee Harvey Oswald two days after the assassination of John F. Kennedy. He was born in Chicago, and operated nightclubs in Texas. According to the House Select Committee on Assassinations and journalists, Ruby had links to organized crime.

Oswald had been arrested for Kennedy's assassination in Dallas, Texas. On November 24, 1963, two days after the assassination, Ruby shot and fatally wounded Oswald in the basement of the Dallas Police Headquarters, and was immediately arrested. The shooting was captured on live television. In March 1964, he was convicted and sentenced to death for Oswald's murder. The conviction was overturned on appeal in 1966, and Ruby was granted a new trial, but he fell ill, was diagnosed with cancer, and died of a pulmonary embolism on January 3, 1967.

In 1964, the Warren Commission concluded that there was no evidence Jack Ruby was part of a conspiracy. Despite this, Ruby's killing of Oswald has stoked John F. Kennedy assassination conspiracy theories.

== Early life, family, and education ==
Jacob Rubenstein was born on or around March 25, 1911, to Joseph Rubenstein, a carpenter, and Fannie Turek Rutkowski (or Rokowsky), both Polish-born Orthodox Jews residing in the Maxwell Street area of Chicago, Illinois. He was the fifth of his parents' 10 surviving children. During his childhood, the parents often behaved violently towards each other and frequently separated; Ruby's mother was eventually committed to a psychiatric hospital.

His troubled childhood and adolescence were marked by juvenile delinquency, with time being spent in foster care. He was arrested at the age of 11 for truancy. A childhood friend of Ruby's was the future boxer Barney Ross. He and Ross ran innocuous errands given to them by the gangster Al Capone. They also hung around at the gym and pool hall owned by Davy Miller. From his early childhood, Ruby was nicknamed "Sparky" by those who knew him. His sister, Eva Grant, said that he acquired the nickname because he resembled a slow-moving horse named "Spark Plug" or "Sparky" in the contemporary comic strip Barney Google. Other accounts say that the name was given because of his quick temper. Grant stated that Ruby did not like the nickname and was quick to fight anyone who called him that.

== Career ==
Ruby left school at 16. He made money through ticket scalping and selling horse race tip sheets. Around 1937, he became an organizer in Local 20467 of the Scrap Iron and Junk Handlers Union. In 1939, union president Leon Cooke was murdered. Cooke was a friend of Ruby, and he was investigated as a suspect, although he was cleared of any wrongdoing. He adopted the middle name "Leon" in tribute to his friend. When Paul Dorfman replaced Cooke as president, Ruby continued on in the union for another two months before leaving. According to Dorfman, Ruby was fired by the union on the orders of the American Federation of Labor regional office when it temporarily took over the union following Cooke's murder.

In 1941, Ruby and Harry Epstein organized the Spartan Novelty Co., a small firm that sold small cedar chests containing candy and punchboards. He designed plaques for sale commemorating the attack on Pearl Harbor, but his perfectionism led to production delays.

Ruby was drafted in 1943 and served in the United States Army Air Forces during World War II, working as an aircraft mechanic at US bases until 1946. He had an honorable record and was promoted to private first class. Upon discharge, in 1946, Ruby returned to Chicago.

In 1947, Ruby moved to Dallas, purportedly because of the failure of merchandise deals in Chicago and to help operate his sister's nightclub. Soon afterward he and his brothers shortened their surnames from Rubenstein to Ruby. The stated reason for the name change was that the name "Rubenstein" was too long and that he was "well known" as Jack Ruby. Ruby later managed nightclubs, strip clubs, and dance halls in Dallas. He developed close ties to many Dallas Police officers who frequented his nightclubs, where he provided them with free liquor, prostitutes, and other favors. Ruby's nightclubs were also frequented by Buck Owens, who discovered Lulu Roman—then working as bawdy comic relief at one of Ruby's clubs—and hired Roman to join the cast of Hee Haw. Ruby hired the singer Jewel Brown to perform at his clubs after they were introduced by James Henry Dolan. She stopped working for Ruby after about a year when they had a falling out.

Ruby developed financial problems during this period and often borrowed money from friends, family, and business associates. He was often in conflict with the Internal Revenue Service (IRS) and at one point owed 6 years of back taxes. In 1959, he became a member of the Dallas Chamber of Commerce due to the help of Judge Joe B. Brown. Brown later served as the judge for Ruby's trial for the murder of Lee Harvey Oswald.

== Illegal activities ==
Some critics have said that Ruby was involved in illegal activity such as gambling, narcotics, and prostitution. An FBI report in 1956 stated that informant Eileen Curry had moved to Dallas with her boyfriend, James Breen, after jumping bail on narcotics charges. Breen told her that he had made connections with a large narcotics setup operating between Texas, Mexico, and the East, and that "James got the okay to operate through Ruby of Dallas." Dallas County Sheriff Steve Guthrie told the FBI that he believed that Ruby "operated some prostitution activities and other vices out of his club" in Dallas. Dallas disc jockey Kenneth Dowe testified that Ruby was known around the station for "procuring women for different people who came to town".

From 1949 up until the murder of Oswald, Ruby had nine criminal charges, ranging from assault to violating state liquor law.

== Character ==
According to people interviewed by law enforcement and the Warren Commission, Ruby was desperate to attract attention to himself and his club. He knew a great number of people in Dallas but had only a few friends. Because his business ventures were unsuccessful, he was heavily in debt.

The Commission received reports of Ruby's penchant for violence. He had a volatile temper, and he often resorted to violence with employees who had upset him. He acted as the bouncer of his own club and beat his customers on at least 25 occasions. The fights would often end with Ruby throwing his victims down the club's stairs. In one fight with a man, the man bit Ruby's left index finger so badly that the doctors had it amputated.

Stories of Ruby's eccentric and unstable behavior describe him as sometimes taking his shirt or other clothes off in social gatherings and either hitting his chest like a gorilla or rolling around on the floor. During conversations, he could change the topic suddenly in mid-sentence. He sometimes welcomed a guest to his club, but on other nights he would forbid the same guest from entering. He was described by those who knew him as "a kook", "totally unpredictable", "a psycho", and "suffering from some form of disturbance".

== Personal life ==
Ruby never married and did not have any children. At the time of the assassination, Ruby was living with George Senator, who referred to Ruby as "my boyfriend" during the Warren Commission hearing, although he denied the two were lovers. Warren Commission lawyer Burt Griffin later told author Gerald Posner, "I'm not sure if Senator was honest with us about his relationship with Ruby. People did not advertise their homosexuality in 1963".

== John F. Kennedy assassination ==
=== November 21 ===
The Warren Commission attempted to reconstruct Ruby's movements from November 21, 1963, through November 24. The Commission reported that he was attending to his duties as the proprietor of the Carousel Club located at 1312 1/2 Commerce St. in downtown Dallas and the Vegas Club in the city's Oak Lawn district from the afternoon of November 21 to the early hours of November 22. A number of Dallas police officers were meeting in the office of Assistant District Attorney Ben Ellis when Ruby entered and passed out business cards advertising a performance by Jada, a stripper at the Carousel. Reportedly, Ruby introduced himself to Ellis and added: "You probably don't know me now, but you will."

=== November 22: Assassination of Kennedy ===
According to the Warren Commission, on November 22, Ruby was in the second-floor advertising offices of The Dallas Morning News, five blocks away from the Texas School Book Depository, placing weekly advertisements for his nightclubs, when he learned of the assassination around 12:45 p.m. According to witnesses, Ruby was visibly shaken. Ruby then made phone calls to his assistant at the Carousel Club and to his sister. The Commission stated that an employee of the Dallas Morning News estimated that Ruby left the newspaper's offices at 1:30 p.m., but indicated that other testimony suggested that he had left earlier. According to the Warren Commission, Ruby arrived back at the Carousel Club shortly before 1:45 p.m. to notify employees that the club would be closed that evening.

John Newnam, an employee at the newspaper's advertisement department, testified that Ruby became upset over an anti-Kennedy ad published in the Morning News that was signed by "The American Fact-Finding Committee, Bernard Weissman, Chairman." Ruby was sensitive to antisemitism and was distressed that an ad attacking the President was signed by a person with a "Jewish name." Early the next morning, Ruby noticed a political billboard featuring the text "IMPEACH EARL WARREN" in block letters. Ruby's sister Eva testified that Ruby had told her that he believed that the anti-Kennedy ad and the anti-Warren sign were connected and were a plot by a "gentile" to blame the assassination on the Jews.

Ruby was seen in the halls of the Dallas Police Headquarters on several occasions after Oswald's arrest for the murder of Dallas policeman J. D. Tippit. He was present at an arranged press conference with Oswald. Ruby later told the FBI that he had his .38 Colt Cobra revolver in his right pocket during the press conference. Newsreel footage from WFAA-TV (Dallas) and NBC shows that Ruby impersonated a newspaper reporter during a press conference held by District Attorney Henry Wade at Dallas Police Headquarters that night. Wade briefed reporters that Oswald was a member of the anti-Castro Free Cuba Committee. Ruby was one of several people there who spoke up to correct Wade, saying, "Henry, that's the Fair Play for Cuba Committee", a pro-Castro organization.

=== November 24: Murder of Oswald ===
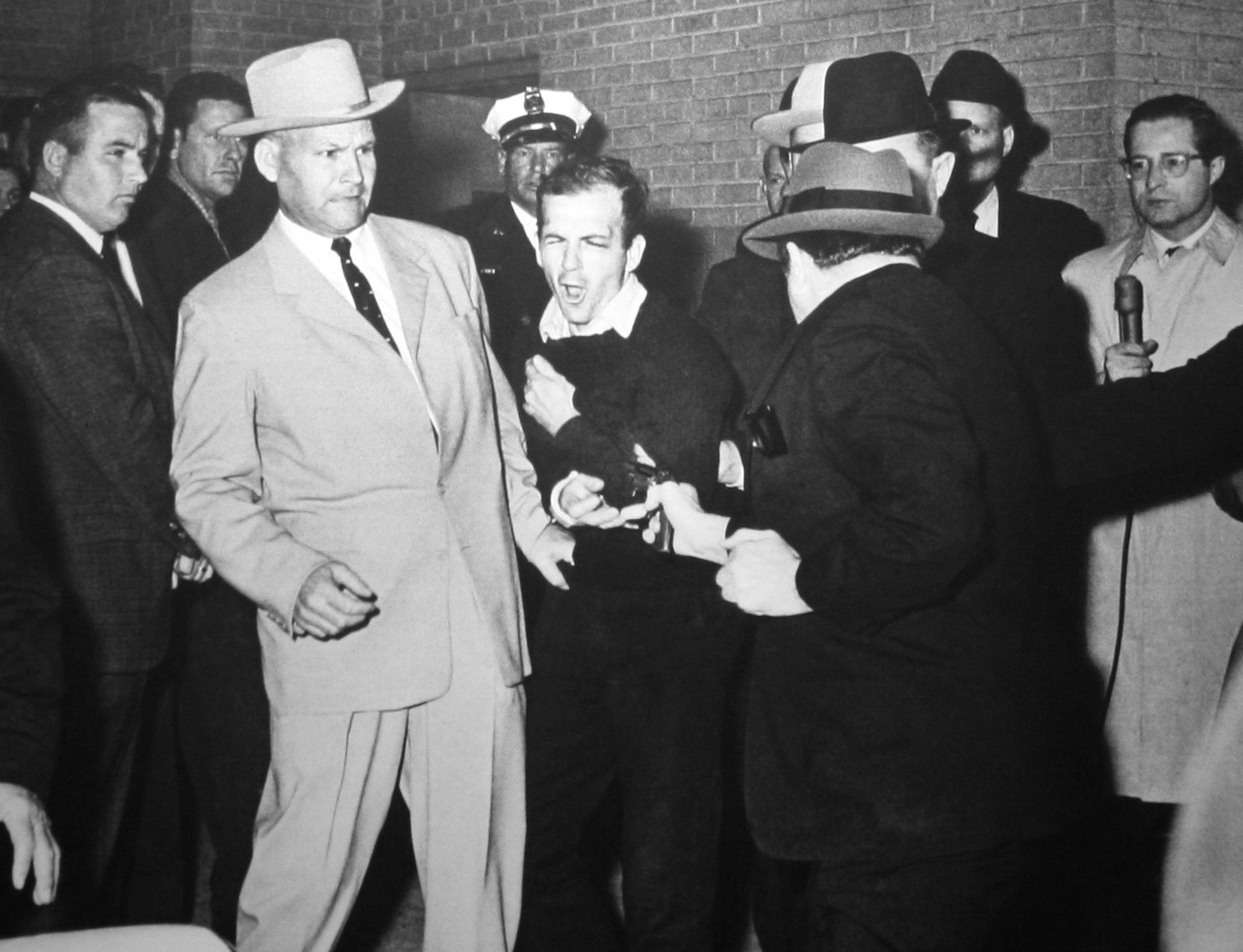
Pulitzer Prize-winning photograph by Robert H. Jackson of Ruby shooting Oswald, who is flanked by Dallas police detectives Jim Leavelle (left, tan suit) and L. C. Graves (right, black hat, face covered by Ruby)

On November 24, 1963, at 11:21 a.m. CST, Oswald was being escorted by Dallas police detectives Jim Leavelle and L. C. Graves through the police basement to an armored car that was to take Oswald to the nearby county jail when Ruby, who was standing in a crowd of reporters, emerged with his revolver aimed at Oswald's abdomen. Ruby passed by William Harrison, who saw the gun and began to reach his hand out. Detective Billy Combest described Ruby's facial expression as that of a "determined look or grimace". Ruby fired a single shot into Oswald's abdomen at point-blank range, mortally wounding him. Combest exclaimed, "Jack, you son of a bitch!"

Immediately, Graves grabbed for Ruby's gun, and Harrison grabbed Ruby's shoulder. As the armored car was rolling down the ramp the moment Ruby emerged, it slightly hit Ruby's leg, causing him to almost lose balance as he was immediately subdued by police. Ruby and Oswald were both taken into the basement-level jail office. After Ruby was handcuffed and taken up in the elevator, Oswald was placed in an ambulance and driven to Parkland Memorial Hospital, the same hospital where President Kennedy had died two days earlier.

At Parkland, surgeons subsequently determined Ruby's bullet had entered Oswald's left side in the front part of the abdomen and caused extensive damage to his spleen, stomach, aorta, vena cava, kidney, liver, diaphragm, and eleventh rib before coming to rest on his right side. Oswald died at 1:07 p.m.

==== Reaction ====
A network television pool camera was broadcasting live to cover Oswald's transfer; millions of people watching on NBC saw the shooting as it happened, and in a matter of minutes it was on other networks. Several photographs were taken of the event, capturing the moments when Ruby pulled the trigger. In 1964, Robert H. Jackson of the Dallas Times Herald was awarded the Pulitzer Prize for Photography for his image, titled Jack Ruby Shoots Lee Harvey Oswald.

Great indignation was directed towards Ruby's murder of Oswald. Many felt that the killing had robbed the nation of essential information and left questions unanswered. When asked, former vice president Richard Nixon said, "The man who was guilty of murdering the President of the United States deserved to die, but under our legal system, he was also entitled to a trial [...] two wrongs don't make a right." Oswald's murder compounded suspicions that the Kennedy assassination was part of a larger plot.

Not all were shocked, however. The crowd outside the headquarters applauded when they heard that Oswald had been shot. In Dallas and elsewhere in the nation, Oswald was hated in death, and Ruby was viewed as a hero by some citizens. During his time in jail, he received many letters from the public, often praising him for his actions.

== Prosecution ==
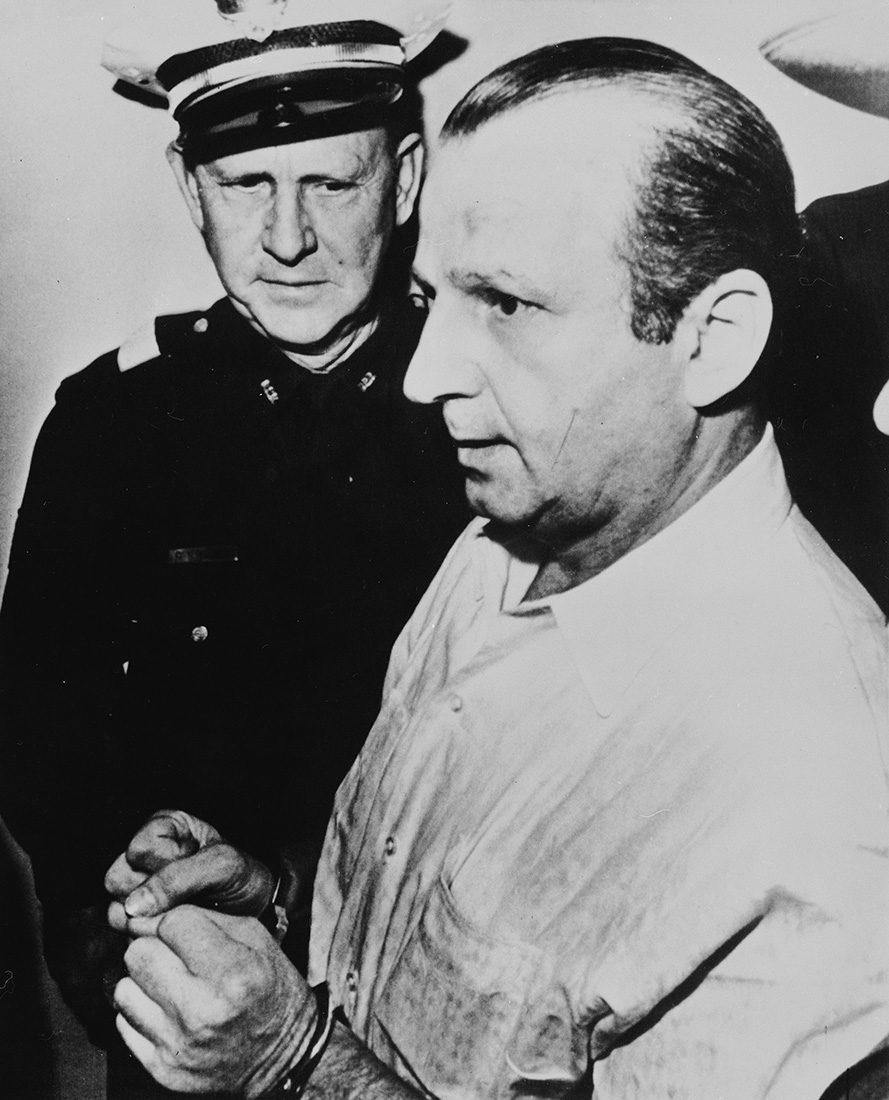
Ruby after his arrest

After his arrest, Ruby said that he had been distraught over Kennedy's death, had wanted to help the city of Dallas "redeem" itself in the eyes of the public, and that he was "saving Mrs. Kennedy the discomfiture of coming back to trial". He also claimed that he shot Oswald on the spur of the moment when the opportunity presented itself, without considering any reason for doing so. Ruby said that he was an admirer of the Kennedy family, that he cried when he heard that Kennedy was shot, was "in mourning" after, "cried a great deal" Saturday afternoon, and was depressed that night. The grief over the assassination, Ruby stated, finally "reached the point of insanity," suddenly compelling him to shoot when Oswald walked in front of him in the basement that Sunday morning.

At the time of the shooting, Ruby said that he was taking phenmetrazine (Preludin), a central nervous system stimulant. Ruby also said that he entered the police basement by coming down the Main Street ramp. Later, Ruby expressed remorse to his brother Earl, saying he never wanted Oswald to die. Ruby asked Dallas attorney Tom Howard to represent him. Howard accepted and asked Ruby if he could think of anything that might damage his defense. Ruby responded that there would be a problem if a man by the name of "Davis" should come up. Ruby told his attorney that he "had been involved with Davis, who was a gunrunner entangled in anti-Castro efforts."

Ruby's brother Earl replaced Howard with prominent San Francisco defense attorney Melvin Belli, who agreed to represent him pro bono. Lawyer Joe H. Tonahill also signed on to assist with Ruby's defense. At his bond hearing in January 1964, while talking to reporters, Ruby tearfully said, regarding the assassination of Kennedy, that he could not understand "how a great man like that could be lost." Belli tried to argue that Ruby was mentally ill and employed the insanity defense. He told the press that "Ruby is an intense, emotional man. Talking to him, the hair rose on the hackles of my neck. I felt horror, revulsion, sadness". Ruby was uncomfortable with Belli's defense strategy, which included Ruby not testifying at all during the trial. Ruby said he would have liked to testify but that "Mr. Belli knows better, I guess".

Ruby stated that he thought he said, "You killed my President, you rat!" as he shot Oswald. Officer McMillon testified he heard Ruby say, "You rat son of a bitch, you shot the president". This was disputed by footage showing McMillon looking in the opposite direction from the shooting. Dallas police sergeant Patrick Dean testified that when Ruby was arrested, Ruby said he thought about killing Oswald two nights earlier to show the world that "Jews have guts." Detective Don Archer said Ruby had told him he intended to shoot Oswald three times, and McMillon corroborated this.

On March 14, 1964, Ruby was convicted of murder with malice and was sentenced to death. Belli was fired by Ruby and his family as a result. Ruby requested that Percy Foreman represent him, although this arrangement lasted only a few days before Foreman quit over disagreements on legal strategy with Ruby's family. He was replaced by Hubert Winston Smith. Ruby's conviction was overturned by the Texas Court of Criminal Appeals on the grounds that "an oral confession of premeditation made while in police custody" should have been ruled inadmissible because it violated a Texas criminal statute. The court also ruled that the venue should have been changed to a Texas county other than the one in which the high-profile crime had been committed.

During the six months following the assassination, Ruby repeatedly asked to speak to the members of the Warren Commission. The Commission initially showed no interest, but Ruby's sister Eileen wrote letters to the Commission and her letters became public. The Commission finally agreed to talk to Ruby. In June 1964, Chief Justice Earl Warren, Representative (and future President) Gerald R. Ford of Michigan, and other Commission members went to Dallas to see Ruby.

Ruby asked Warren several times to take him to Washington D.C., saying that "my life is in danger here" and that he wanted an opportunity to make additional statements. He added: "I want to tell the truth, and I can't tell it here." Ruby said that the people from whom he felt himself to be in danger were the John Birch Society of Dallas, including Edwin Walker, who he claimed were trying to falsely implicate him as being involved in a conspiracy to assassinate the President. Warren told Ruby that he would be unable to comply with his request because many legal barriers would need to be overcome, and public interest in the situation would be too heavy. Warren also told Ruby that the Commission would have no way of protecting him since it had no police powers. Ruby said that he wanted to convince President Lyndon Johnson that he was not part of any conspiracy to kill Kennedy.

Eventually, the appellate court agreed with Ruby's lawyers that he should be granted a new trial. On October 5, 1966, the court ruled that his motion for a change of venue before the original trial court should have been granted. Ruby's conviction and death sentence were overturned.

Arrangements were underway for a new trial to be held in February 1967 in Wichita Falls, Texas, but Ruby was admitted to Parkland Hospital on December 9, 1966, suffering from pneumonia, where he was diagnosed with cancer in his liver, lungs, and brain. His condition rapidly deteriorated. An armed guard was placed outside his room, but family and friends were allowed to visit. On December 16, Earl Ruby, accompanied by one of his brother's lawyers, smuggled a tape recorder hidden in a briefcase into Jack's room to record an interview about his murder of Oswald. Ruby maintained that he entered the basement by coming down the ramp, had killed Oswald out of grief over the assassination, and denied knowing Oswald prior. According to an unnamed Associated Press source, Ruby made a final statement from his hospital bed on December 19 that he had acted alone. "There is nothing to hide," Ruby said, "there was no one else."

== Death ==
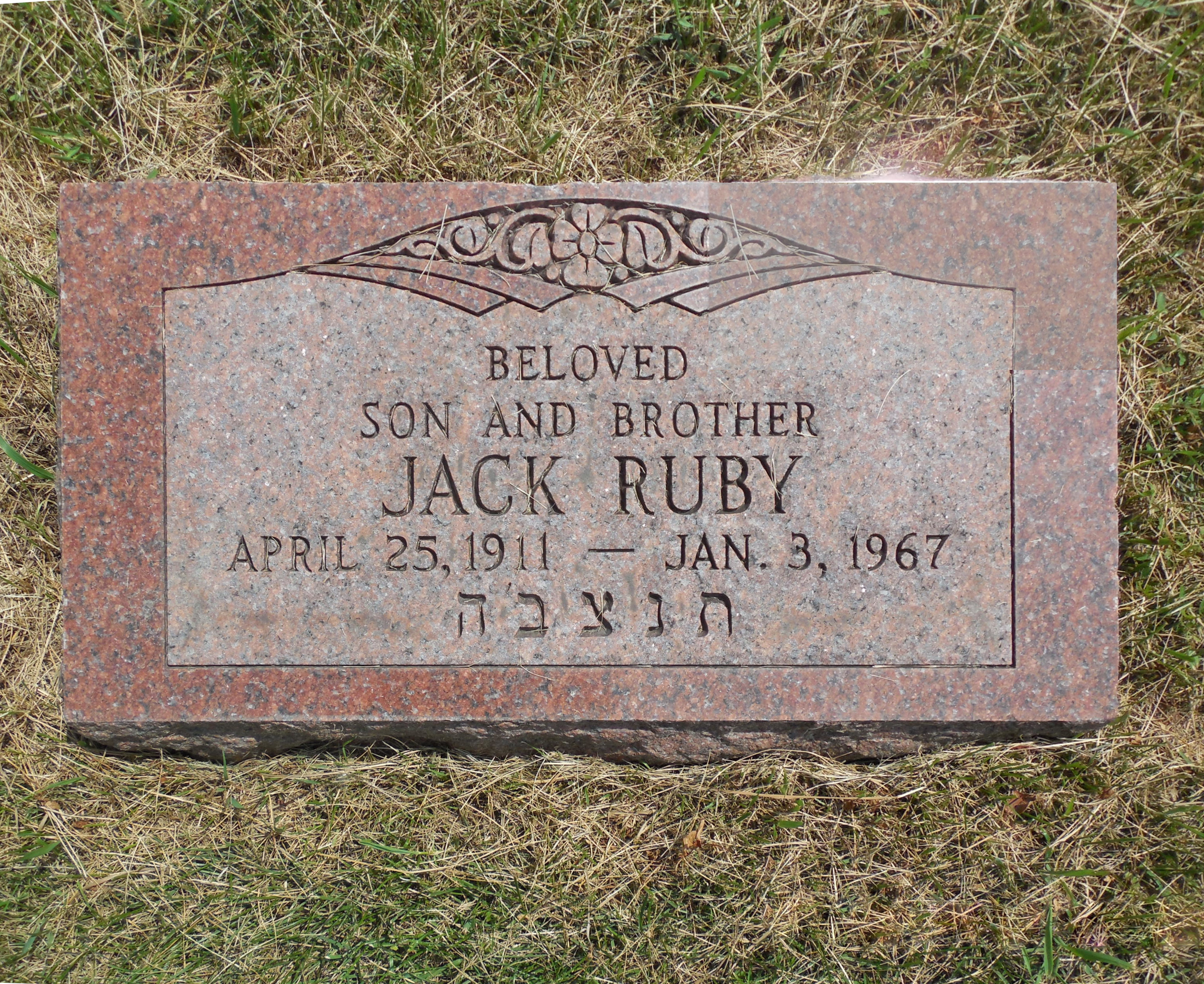
Headstone at Ruby's grave in Westlawn Cemetery. The Hebrew text is an abbreviation of tehei nishmaso tserurah bitsror hachaim, "may his soul be bound with the bond of life."

Ruby died of a pulmonary embolism on January 3, 1967, at Parkland Hospital. He is buried beside his parents in the Westlawn Cemetery in Norridge, Illinois.

== Official investigations ==
=== Warren Commission ===
The Warren Commission found no evidence linking Ruby's killing of Oswald with any broader conspiracy to assassinate Kennedy. The Warren Report provided a detailed biography of Ruby's life and activities to help ascertain whether he was involved in a conspiracy to assassinate Kennedy. The Warren Commission also investigated rumors that Ruby and Oswald knew each other and that Oswald was seen at Ruby's Carousel Club. (Note: Television footage showed Oswald briefly glancing in Ruby's direction as Ruby emerged to shoot him, compounding suspicions. Analysis of the footage indicates that Oswald may have been looking at reporter Ike Pappas, who had held his microphone out toward Oswald and who asked, "Do you have anything to say in your defense?") The Warren Commission concluded that various witnesses linking Ruby and Oswald lacked credibility and that there was no solid evidence to link the two men. The Commission indicated that there was not a "significant link between Ruby and organized crime" and said Ruby acted independently in killing Oswald.

The Warren Commission noted testimony indicating Ruby entered the basement of the headquarters just as Oswald was being transferred, and that Ruby's shooting of Oswald was a spontaneous, unplanned act. Ruby drove into town with his pet dachshund, Sheba, to send an emergency money order at the Western Union on Main Street to one of his employees. The time stamp was 11:17 a.m. for the transaction. Ruby then walked half a block to the Dallas police headquarters, where he made his way into the basement. Warren Commission investigator David Belin said that postal inspector Harry Holmes arrived unannounced at the Dallas police station on the morning that Ruby shot Oswald and, upon invitation by the investigators, had questioned Oswald, thus delaying his transfer by half an hour. Belin noted that, had Ruby been part of a conspiracy, he would have been downtown 30 minutes earlier, when Oswald had been scheduled to be transferred. The Commission accepted Ruby's claim that he entered the police basement via the Main Street ramp. Warren Report supporters have questioned why Ruby would have left his beloved dog in his car if his killing of Oswald had been planned.

Some of Ruby's friends, relatives (notably his brother Earl and sister Eva), and associates, expressed belief that Ruby acted alone, maintaining that he was upset over Kennedy's death, crying on occasions, and closing his clubs as a mark of respect. They rejected conspiracy theorists' claims, saying that Ruby's connection with gangsters was minimal at most and that he was not the sort of person who would be entrusted to be part of a conspiracy.

Dallas reporter Tony Zoppi, who knew Ruby well, claimed that one "would have to be crazy" to entrust Ruby with anything as important as a high-level plot to kill Kennedy since he "couldn't keep a secret for five minutes ... Jack was one of the most talkative guys you would ever meet. He'd be the worst fellow in the world to be part of a conspiracy, because he just plain talked too much." He and others described Ruby as the sort who enjoyed being at "the center of attention", trying to make friends with people and being more of a nuisance.

Some writers, including former Los Angeles District Attorney Vincent Bugliosi, dismiss Ruby's connections to organized crime as being highly minimal: "It is very noteworthy that without exception, not one of these conspiracy theorists knew or had ever met Jack Ruby. Without our even resorting to his family and roommate, all of whom think the suggestion of Ruby being connected to the mob is ridiculous, those who knew him, unanimously and without exception, think the notion of his being connected to the Mafia, and then killing Oswald for them, is nothing short of laughable."

Bill Alexander, who prosecuted Ruby for Oswald's murder, equally rejected any suggestions that Ruby was involved with organized crime, claiming that conspiracy theorists based it on the claim that "A knew B, and Ruby knew B back in 1950, so he must have known A, and that must be the link to the conspiracy."

Ruby's brother Earl denied allegations that Jack was involved in racketeering at Chicago nightclubs, and author Gerald Posner suggested in his book Case Closed: Lee Harvey Oswald and the Assassination of JFK that witnesses may have confused Ruby with Harry Rubenstein, a convicted Chicago felon. Zoppi was also dismissive of mob ties and described Ruby as a "born loser".

== Other investigations and dissenting theories ==
Many critics have challenged the evidence and conclusions of the Warren Commission and have proposed other theories, particularly regarding Ruby's murder of Oswald.

=== Ruby's motive ===
White House correspondent Seth Kantor, who was a passenger in Kennedy's motorcade, testified that he had visited Parkland Hospital after Kennedy was shot and that he felt a tug on his coat as he entered the hospital at about 1:30 p.m. He turned around to see Jack Ruby, who called him by his first name and shook his hand. He said that he had become acquainted with Ruby while he was a reporter for the Dallas Times Herald newspaper. According to Kantor, Ruby asked him if he thought that it would be a good idea for him to close his nightclubs for the next three nights because of the tragedy, and Kantor responded without thinking that doing so would be a good idea.

Witness Wilma Tice testified to the Warren Commission that she saw Jack Ruby at Parkland Hospital. She also said that she saw a man, who may have been Seth Kantor, call Jack Ruby "Jack", Ruby denied that he had been at Parkland Hospital, and the Warren Commission dismissed Kantor's testimony, saying that the encounter at Parkland Hospital would have had to have taken place in a span of a few minutes before and after 1:30 p.m., as evidenced by telephone company records of calls made by both people. The Commission also pointed to contradictory witness testimony and to the lack of video confirmation of Ruby at the scene. The Commission concluded that "Kantor probably did not see Ruby at Parkland Hospital" and "may have been mistaken about both the time and the place that he saw Ruby."

In 1979, the House Select Committee on Assassinations (HSCA) re-examined Kantor's testimony and stated, "the Warren Commission concluded that Kantor was mistaken" about his Parkland encounter with Ruby, but "the Committee determined he probably was not." Kantor wrote in his book, Who Was Jack Ruby?:

The mob was Ruby's "friend." And Ruby could well have been paying off an IOU the day he was used to kill Lee Harvey Oswald. Remember: "I have been used for a purpose," the way Ruby expressed it to Chief Justice Warren in their June 7, 1964 session. It would not have been hard for the mob to maneuver Ruby through the ranks of a few negotiable police.

The House Select Committee on Assassinations wrote in its 1979 Final Report:

Ruby's shooting of Oswald was not a spontaneous act, in that it involved at least some premeditation. Similarly, the committee believed it was less likely that Ruby entered the police basement without assistance, even though the assistance may have been provided with no knowledge of Ruby's intentions.... The committee was troubled by the apparently unlocked doors along the stairway route and the removal of security guards from the area of the garage nearest the stairway shortly before the shooting.... There is also evidence that the Dallas Police Department withheld relevant information from the Warren Commission concerning Ruby's entry to the scene of the Oswald transfer.

The HSCA suggested Ruby might have entered the basement via a stairway accessible from an alleyway next to the Dallas Municipal Building.

Garrett C. Hallmark, manager of the parking garage, said that Ruby talked on the phone at 3 p.m. on November 23 to somebody called Ken. He was seeking confirmation of the scheduled time for Oswald's transfer, and he said, "You know I'll be there." Later that evening, waitress Wanda Helmick at Bull-Pen Drive-In Restaurant in Arlington, Texas, which was operated by Ralph Paul, a close friend and business associate of Ruby, said that Ruby rang Paul and that she overheard that Paul said something about a gun, and he asked Ruby if he was crazy.

Lieutenant Billy Grammer, a dispatcher for the Dallas Police Department, claimed that he received an anonymous phone call at 3 a.m. on November 24 from a man who told him that he knew of the plan to move Oswald from the basement and warned that, unless the plan were changed, "we are going to kill him." After Oswald was shot, Grammer claimed to have recognized Ruby as the caller and expressed belief that Ruby's shooting of Oswald was "a planned event." In a declassified FBI memo written by J. Edgar Hoover from the day of Oswald's shooting, he reported that the night before Oswald's death, the FBI in Dallas received a call from "a man talking in a calm voice and saying he was a member of a committee organized to kill Oswald". The FBI called the chief of Dallas police both at that time and the morning after to ensure Oswald would be kept safe. Hoover adds that "however, this was not done".

Some critics point to eyewitness testimony, which seems to contradict the official claim that Ruby was at home until 10:30 a.m. on November 24 and instead seems to indicate that Ruby was around the police headquarters asking about Oswald's transfer all morning. Ruby's roommate, George Senator, testified that on November 24, Ruby was in his apartment until about 10:30 a.m. However, Elnora Pitts, Ruby's cleaning lady, phoned between 8:30 and 9:00 a.m. to check it was alright for her to do her usual Sunday morning cleaning for Ruby (which she had been doing for several weeks). The man who answered claimed to be Ruby but did not sound like him, did not recognize Pitts and had no knowledge of the Sunday cleaning arrangements she had with Ruby. Johnnie Smith, of WBAP-TV, was in a TV truck outside the headquarters that morning, and he said that he saw a man twice between 8 a.m. and 10 a.m.; the man came to the truck to inquire about Oswald's transfer. Smith said that he recognized the man as Ruby from a picture in the paper, though he said he could not recognize him from a mug shot. WBAP cameraman Ira Walker testified that a man came up to his TV truck at just after 10:30 a.m. and inquired about Oswald's transfer. He identified the man as Ruby, as did Warren Richey, who was on top of the truck with his camera.

In his Warren Commission testimony, Detective Don Archer claimed that, after his arrest, Ruby looked him straight in the eye and said, "Well, I intended to shoot him three times." Kantor wrote that Ruby's response to Archer did not suggest a spontaneous reaction and that he implied having prior intention. On another occasion Archer also said that Ruby was agitated and sweating, but when Archer informed Ruby that Oswald had died, "he became calm", and that this struck him as "a complete difference in behaviour from what I expected", leading him to believe that "his life had depended on his getting Oswald".

Ruby's explanation for killing Oswald would be exposed "as a fabricated legal ploy", according to the House Select Committee on Assassinations. Ruby wrote a note to attorney Joseph Tonahill: "Joe, you should know this. My first lawyer Tom Howard told me to say that I shot Oswald so that Caroline and Mrs. Kennedy wouldn't have to come to Dallas to testify. OK?"

G. Robert Blakey, who was chief counsel for the House Select Committee on Assassinations from 1977 to 1979, said: "The most plausible explanation for the murder of Oswald by Jack Ruby was that Ruby had stalked him on behalf of organized crime, trying to reach him on at least three occasions in the forty-eight hours before he silenced him forever."

Russell Moore, an acquaintance of Ruby, testified to the Commission that Ruby expressed no bitterness towards Oswald and called him "a good looking guy", comparing him to the actor Paul Newman. Announcer Glen Duncan also said Ruby described Oswald as a "fairly nice looking kid", comparing him to Newman.

Author David Scheim writes that while some described Ruby as upset over the weekend of the assassination, others said that he was not. TV newsman Vic Robertson Jr. saw Ruby at police headquarters on Friday night and said that he "appeared to be anything but under stress or strain. He seemed happy, jovial, was joking and laughing." Duncan also said that Ruby "was not grieving" and seemed "happy that evidence was piling up against Oswald."

Scheim also suggests that Ruby made a "candid confession" when giving testimony to the Warren Commission. During his testimony, Ruby teared up when talking about a Saturday morning eulogy for Kennedy, but after composing himself, inexplicably said, "I must be a great actor, I tell you that." Ruby also remarked that "they didn't ask me another question: 'If I loved the President so much, why wasn't I at the parade?'" (referring to the presidential motorcade) and "it's strange that perhaps I didn't vote for President Kennedy, or didn't vote at all, that I should build up such a great affection for him." Ruby's club stripper, Jada, during an interview with ABC's Paul Good, said that "I believe [Ruby] disliked Bobby Kennedy".

Schiem also noted some who knew Ruby who stated that the patriotic statements which Ruby professed were quite out of character. Ruby's gambling business partner Harry Hall said, "Ruby was the type who was interested in any way to make money," and he also said that he "could not conceive of Ruby doing anything out of patriotism." Jack Kelly had known Ruby since 1943, and he "scoffed at the idea of a patriotic motive..." and felt that Ruby would have killed Oswald "for publicity [or] for money". Ruby's friend Paul Jones also said that he doubted that Ruby "would have become emotionally upset and killed Oswald on the spur of the moment. He felt Ruby would have done it for money."

After his 1964 conviction, Ruby's lawyers, led by Sam Houston Clinton, appealed to the Texas Court of Criminal Appeals, the highest criminal court in Texas. Ruby's lawyers argued that he could not have received a fair trial in Dallas because of the excessive publicity surrounding the case. In a taped interview with reporters in March 1965, Ruby stated: "Everything pertaining to what's happening has never come to the surface. The world will never know the true facts of what occurred, my motive. The people who had so much to gain, and had such an ulterior motive for putting me in the position I'm in, will never let the true facts come above board to the world." A reporter asked, "Are these people in very high positions, Jack?" and he responded, "Yes."

Kantor speculated in 1978 that the "Davis" that Ruby mentioned to Tom Howard may have been Thomas Eli Davis III, a CIA-connected mercenary.

Dallas Deputy Sheriff Al Maddox claimed: "Ruby told me, he said, 'Well, they injected me for a cold.' He said it was cancer cells. That's what he told me, Ruby did. I said you don't believe that bullshit. He said, 'I damn sure do!' One day when I started to leave, Ruby shook hands with me and I could feel a piece of paper in his palm." It was a note in which Ruby claimed that he was part of a conspiracy and that his role was to silence Oswald. Not long before Ruby died, according to an article in the London Sunday Times, he told psychiatrist Werner Teuter that the assassination was "an act of overthrowing the government" and that he knew "who had President Kennedy killed". He added: "I am doomed. I do not want to die. But I am not insane. I was framed to kill Oswald."

On March 11, 1959, FBI agent Charles W. Flynn of the Dallas Office approached Ruby to become a federal informant due to his job as a nightclub operator, since he "might have knowledge of the criminal element in Dallas". Ruby was willing to become an informant and was contacted by the FBI eight times between March 11, 1959, and October 2, 1959, but he provided no information to the Bureau; he was not paid, and contact ceased. (Note: In a 1977 document, it was claimed that Bob Vanderslice, a Dallas Police informant, said Ruby had told him to "watch the fireworks" on November 22 and that both witnessed Kennedy being shot. Posner disputes this story.)

Scheim theorized that Mafia leaders Carlos Marcello and Santo Trafficante Jr. and organized labor leader Jimmy Hoffa ordered the assassination of Kennedy. Scheim cited in particular a 25-fold increase in the number of out-of-state telephone calls from Jack Ruby to associates of these crime bosses in the months before the assassination. According to author Vincent Bugliosi, both the Warren Commission and the House Select Committee on Assassinations determined that all of these calls were related to Ruby seeking help from the American Guild of Variety Artists in a matter concerning two of his competitors. The House Select Committee on Assassinations report stated that "most of Ruby's phone calls during late 1963 were related to his labor troubles. In the light of the identity of some of the individuals with whom Ruby spoke, however, the possibility of other matters being discussed could not be dismissed."

Bill Bonanno, son of New York Mafia boss Joseph Bonanno, stated in Bound By Honor that he realized that certain Mafia families were involved in the JFK assassination when Ruby killed Oswald, since Bonanno was aware that Ruby was an associate of Chicago mobster Sam Giancana.

=== Associations with organized crime and gunrunning allegations ===
Some conspiracy theorists have alleged Ruby had links to organized crime. The House Select Committee on Assassinations undertook a similar investigation of Ruby in 1979, 15 years after the written report, and said that he "had a significant number of associations and direct and indirect contacts with underworld figures" and "the Dallas criminal element," but that he was not a member of organized crime. In a memo dated to the day of Oswald's murder, J. Edgar Hoover, Director of the FBI, wrote that "We have no information on Ruby that is firm, although there are some rumors of underworld activity in Chicago".

Ruby was said to have been acquainted with the Mafia. The HSCA said that Ruby had known Chicago mobsters Sam Giancana and Joseph Campisi since 1947 and had been seen with them on many occasions. After an investigation of Joe Campisi, the HSCA found:

While Campisi's technical characterization in federal law enforcement records as an organized crime member has ranged from definite to suspected to negative, it is clear that he was an associate or friend of many Dallas-based organized crime members, particularly Joseph Civello, during the time he was the head of the Dallas organization. There was no indication that Campisi had engaged in any specific organized crime-related activities.

G. Robert Blakey, the chief counsel for the HSCA, called Campisi "the No. 2 man in the mob in Dallas." He wrote in a 1993 article for The Washington Post: "It is difficult to dispute the underworld pedigree of Jack Ruby, though the Warren Commission did it in 1964. Similarly, a PBS Frontline investigation into the connections between Ruby and Dallas organized crime figures reported the following:

In 1963, Sam and Joe Campisi were leading figures in the Dallas underworld. Jack knew the Campisis and had been seen with them on many occasions. The Campisis were lieutenants of Carlos Marcello, the Mafia boss who had reportedly talked of killing the President.

On the night before Kennedy was assassinated, Ruby and Ralph Paul had dinner together at the Egyptian Lounge run by Joe and Sam Campisi. After Ruby was jailed for killing Oswald, Joe Campisi "regularly visited" him.

Howard P. Willens was the third-highest official in the Department of Justice and assistant counsel to J. Lee Rankin. He helped organize the Warren Commission. Willens also outlined the Commission's investigative priorities and terminated an investigation of Ruby's Cuban-related activities. An FBI report states that Willens' father had been Tony Accardo's next-door neighbor going back to 1958. In 1946, Tony Accardo allegedly asked Jack Ruby to go to Texas with Mafia associates Pat Manno and Romie Nappi to make sure that Dallas County Sheriff Steve Gutherie would acquiesce to the Mafia's expansion into Dallas.

Ruby went to see a man named Lewis McWillie in Cuba four years before the assassination. McWillie had previously run illegal gambling establishments in Texas, and Ruby considered him one of his closest friends. McWillie was supervising gambling activities at Havana's Tropicana Club when Ruby visited him in August 1959. Ruby told the Warren Commission that his August trip to Cuba was merely a social visit at the invitation of McWillie. The HSCA later concluded that Ruby "most likely was serving as a courier for gambling interests". The committee also found circumstantial but not conclusive evidence that "Ruby met with Santo Trafficante Jr. in Cuba sometime in 1959."

James E. Beaird, who claimed to be a poker-playing friend of Ruby, told The Dallas Morning News and the FBI that Ruby smuggled guns and ammunition from Galveston Bay, Texas, to Fidel Castro's guerrillas in Cuba in the late 1950s. Beaird said that Ruby "was in it for the money. It wouldn't matter which side, just the one that would pay him the most." Beaird said that the guns were stored in a two-story house near the waterfront and that he saw Ruby and his associates load "many boxes of new guns, including automatic rifles and handguns" on a 50-foot military-surplus boat. He claimed that "each time that the boat left with guns and ammunition, Jack Ruby was on the boat."

Alternatively, some conspiracy theorists have focused on Ruby's connections to the police in regards to his murder of Oswald, and dismiss his mob connections as a misdirection. Greg Parker alleged Ruby killed Oswald to seek fame, as being under immense pressure, in significant debt, and under the influence of methamphetamines.

== Cultural depictions ==
- Ruby appears as a character in James Ellroy's novel The Cold Six Thousand.
- He serves as a character in the 1988 Don DeLillo novel Libra.

On screen, Ruby has been played by:

- Oscar Oncidi (1973): Executive Action
- Michael Lerner (1978): Ruby and Oswald
- Brian Doyle-Murray (1991): JFK
- Danny Aiello (1992): Ruby
- Jack Lindine (1996): Dark Skies
- Portrayed (2010): Mad Men
- Holland Hayes (2013) (Magic City, episode, "Adapt or Die")
- Casey Siemaszko (2013): Killing Kennedy
- Antoni Corone (2016): 11.22.63
- John Kapelos (2019): The Umbrella Academy
- Robert Carlyle (2026): November 1963
