= J. D. Tippit =

American police officer killed on the day of JFK assassination (1924–1963)

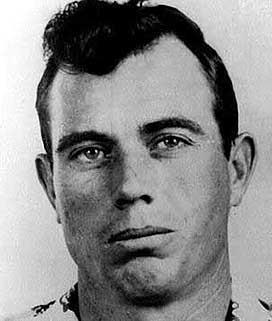
- Tippit, c. 1963
- Born: September 18, 1924 near Annona, Texas, U.S.
- Died: November 22, 1963 (aged 39); Dallas, Texas, U.S.
- Cause of death: Gunshot wounds
- Burial place: Laurel Land Memorial Park; Dallas, Texas, U.S. 32°40′29.06″N 96°49′13.16″W
- Occupation: Police officer
- Spouse: Marie Frances Gasway (m. 1946)
- Children: 3
- Police career
- Department: Dallas Police Department
- Service years: 1952–1963
- Rank: Patrolman
- Badge no.: 848
- Awards: Certificate of Merit; Medal of Valor; Police Medal of Honor; Police Cross; Citizens Traffic Commission Award of Heroism
- Memorials: • Historical marker on SH 37 at CR 1280 southwest of Clarksville (dedicated November 17, 2001) • Historical marker on northeast corner of East 10th Street and South Patton Avenue in Dallas (dedicated November 20, 2012)
- Military career
- Allegiance: United States
- Branch: United States Army
- Service years: 1944–1946
- Unit: 513th Parachute Infantry Regiment
- Conflicts: World War II
- Awards: Bronze Star

J. D. Tippit (Note: Some sources give "J. D." as standing for "Jefferson Davis", but it does not; the initials alone are his given name.) (September 18, 1924 – November 22, 1963) was an American World War II U.S. Army veteran and Bronze Star Medal recipient, who was a police officer with the Dallas Police Department from 1952 to 1963. On Friday November 22, 1963, less than an hour after the assassination of President John F. Kennedy, Tippit was shot and killed in a residential neighborhood in the Oak Cliff section of Dallas, Texas. Lee Harvey Oswald was arrested and charged for the killings of Tippit and Kennedy, but he was murdered two days later, before he could be tried. In 1964, the Warren Commission concluded that Tippit was killed by Oswald acting alone, though Tippit's murder has spawned alternative scenarios from Kennedy assassination conspiracy theorists.

== Early life ==
J. D. Tippit was born near the town of Annona, Texas, in Red River County. He was the eldest of seven children to Edgar Lee Tippit (1902–2006) and Lizzie Mae "May Bug" Rush (1905–1990). The Tippit and Burns families were mostly of English ancestry, their ancestors having immigrated to Virginia from England by 1635. It is sometimes reported that J. D. stood for "Jefferson Davis", but the letters did not stand for anything.

Tippit attended public schools through the tenth grade and was raised as a Baptist, a faith he practiced for the rest of his life. In the fall of 1939, when he was 15 years old, his family moved to Baker Lane, a stretch of dirt road six miles southwest from Clarksville, Texas.

== Military service ==
He served in World War II, entering the United States Army on July 21, 1944. He volunteered for the paratroopers, part of the newly-formed airborne forces. After finishing his training, he was sent to Europe, in January 1945, and was assigned to the 513th Parachute Infantry Regiment (513th PIR), part of the 17th Airborne Division, which had recently fought in the Battle of the Bulge and suffered heavy casualties. He saw combat in Operation Varsity, the airborne crossing of the Rhine River in March 1945, earning a Bronze Star Medal, and remained on active duty until June 20, 1946.

== Career ==
Tippit began working for the Dearborn Stove Company in 1946. He next worked for Sears, Roebuck and Company in the installation department from March 1948 to September 1949 when he was laid off. Tippit and his wife Marie moved to Lone Star, Texas, where Tippit attempted to farm and raise cattle.

In January 1950, Tippit enrolled in a Veterans Administration vocational training school at Bogata, Texas. He left the school in June 1952. After several setbacks as a farmer and rancher, Tippit decided to become a police officer. The Tippit family then relocated to Dallas where Tippit was hired by the Dallas Police Department as a patrolman in July 1952. During his time with the Dallas Police Department, Tippit was cited twice for bravery. On September 2, 1956, Tippit and partner Dale Hankins stopped an intoxicated man acting suspicious, that Tippit thought he had seen in a Colorado wanted poster. The man drew a semi-automatic pistol at Tippit's head and pulled the trigger, but the gun did not fire as he had forgotten to remove the safety. Tippit and Hankins shot the man dead.

At the time of his death, Tippit was earning a monthly salary of $490, equivalent to $5,153 in 2025, as a Dallas police officer. He was working two part-time jobs. He worked at Austin's Barbecue restaurant on Friday and Saturday nights and at the Stevens Park Theatre on Sundays.

== Murder and investigation ==
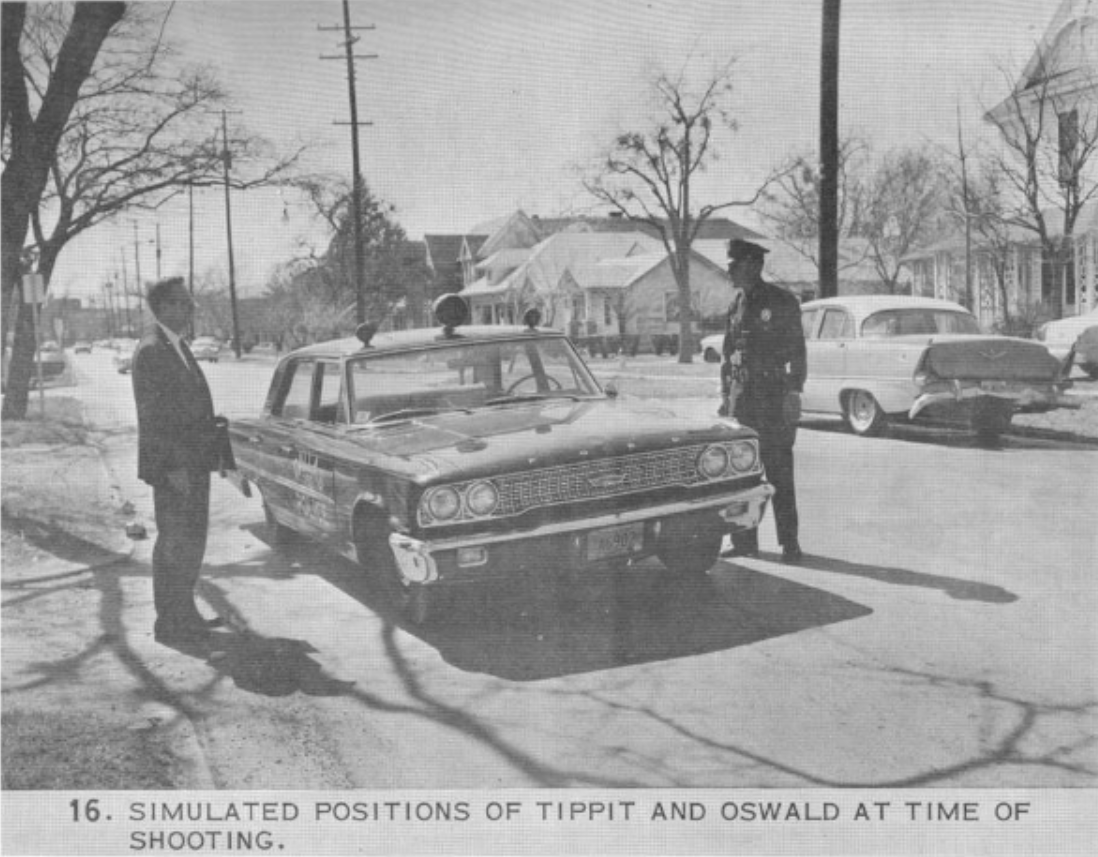
An FBI simulated recreation of the positions of Oswald and officer Tippit at the time of his shooting.

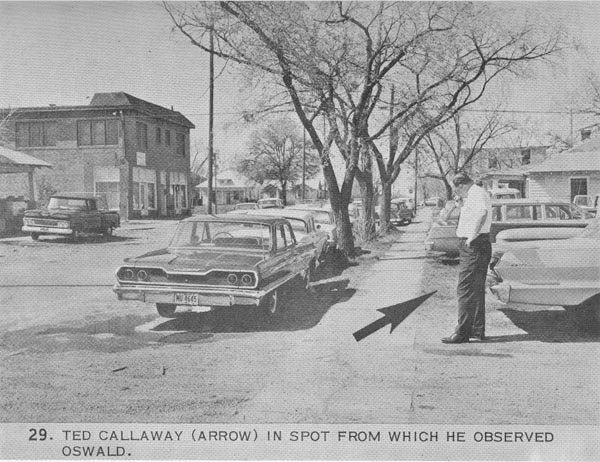
A simulated version of the position of Callaway when he witnessed the shooting of officer Tippit.

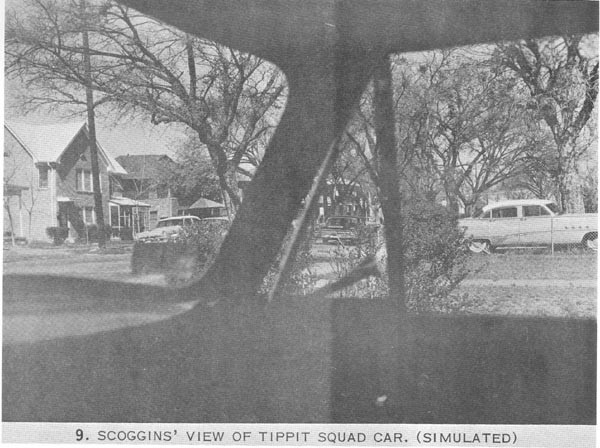
A simulated view of Scoggins when he witnessed the shooting of officer Tippit.

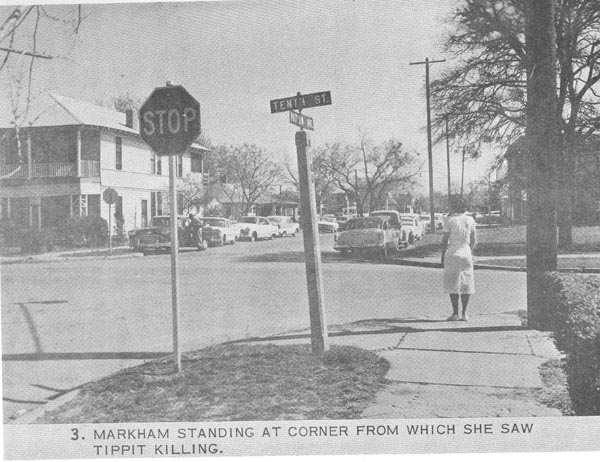
A simulated version of the position of Markham when she witnessed the shooting of officer Tippit.

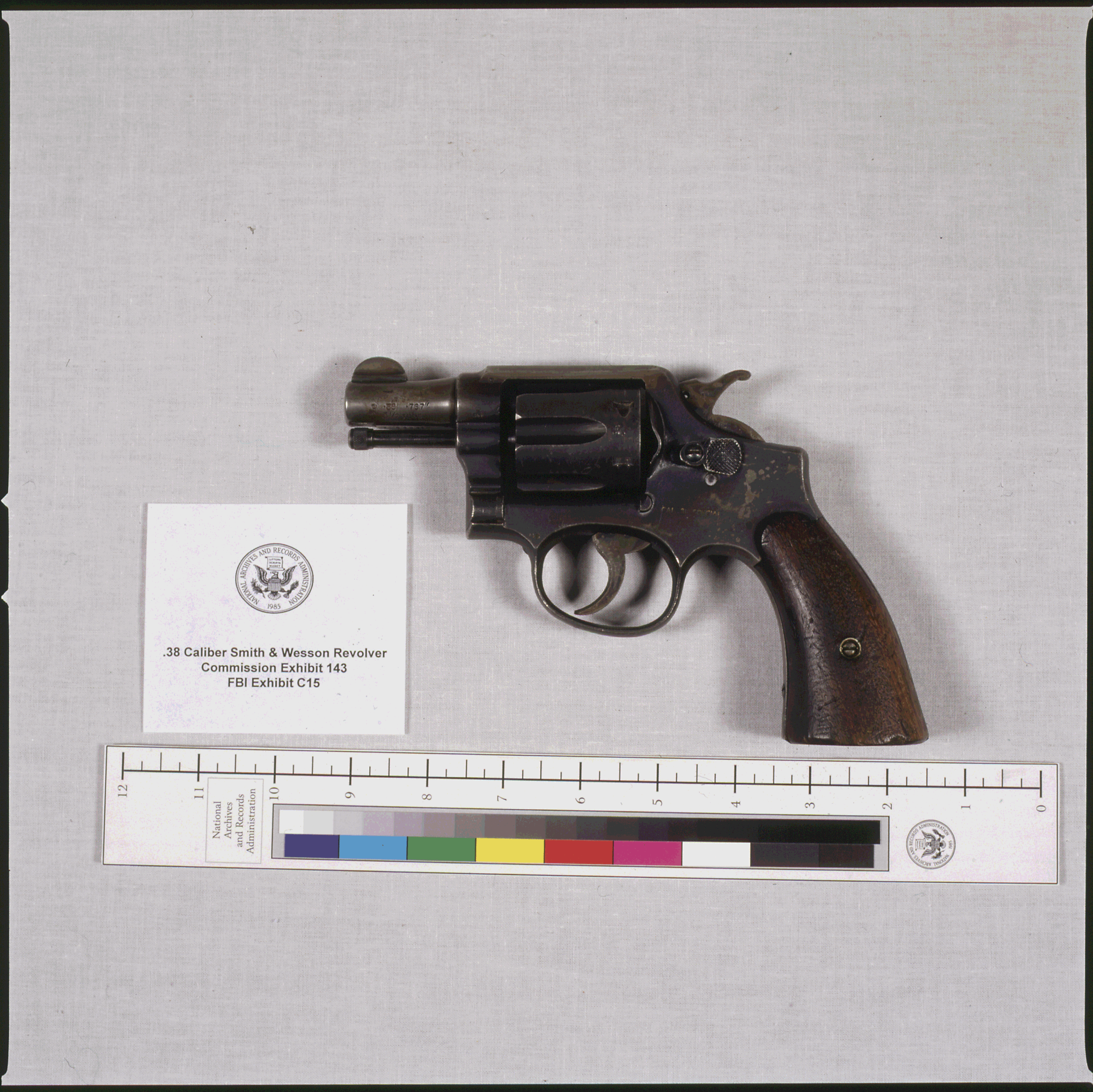
The .38 Caliber Revolver.

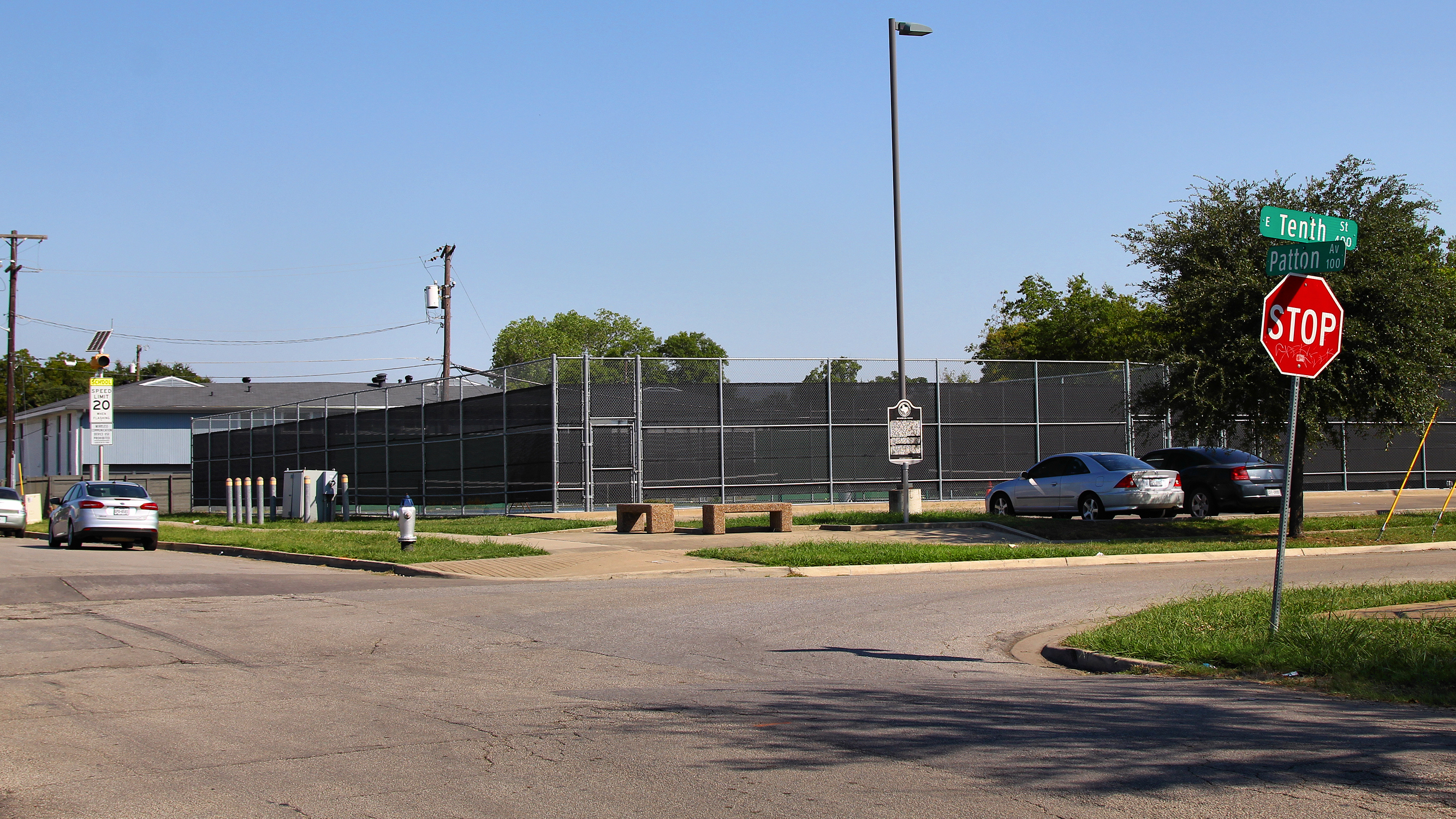
The corner of Tenth Street and Patton Avenue in the Oakcliff Neighborhood of Dallas, Texas, where Tippit was murdered

On November 22, 1963, Tippit was working beat number 78, his normal patrol area in south Oak Cliff, a residential area of Dallas.

At 12:45 p.m., 15 minutes after President Kennedy was shot in Dealey Plaza, Tippit received a radio order to drive to the central Oak Cliff area as part of a concentration of police around the center of the city. At 12:54, Tippit radioed that he had moved as directed. By then, several messages had been broadcast describing a suspect in the shooting as a slender white male, in his early 30s, 5 ft 10 in (1.78 m) tall, and weighing about 165 lb (75 kg). Oswald was a slender white male, 24 years old, 5 ft 9 in (1.75 m) tall, and an estimated weight of 135 lb (61 kg) at autopsy. Tippit spoke his last known words, "10-4", (Note: Police radio code for "Message received and understood".) over his police radio. (Note: This was Tippit's last radio transmission. He apparently spoke to his killer just before being shot.)

The Warren Commission concluded that at approximately 1:11–1:14 p.m., (Note: The first report of Tippit's shooting was transmitted over Police Channel 1 some time between 1:16 and 1:19 p.m., as indicated by verbal time stamps made periodically by the dispatcher. Specifically, the first report began 1 minute 41 seconds after the 1:16 time stamp. Before that, witness Domingo Benavides could be heard unsuccessfully trying to use Tippit's police radio microphone, beginning at 1:16.) Tippit was driving slowly eastward on East 10th Street—about 100 feet (30 m) past the intersection of 10th Street and Patton Avenue—when he pulled alongside a man who resembled the police description. Oswald walked over to Tippit's car and exchanged words with him through an open vent window. Tippit opened his car door and began walking to the front of the car. Oswald then drew his handgun and fired four shots in rapid succession. Three bullets hit Tippit in the chest, and as he lay on the ground, another shot hit his right temple, killing him instantly. Tippit's body was transported from the scene of the shooting by ambulance to Methodist Hospital, where he was pronounced dead at 1:25 p.m. by Dr. Richard A. Liguori.

A short time later, Hardy's shoe store manager Johnny Brewer observed Oswald acting suspiciously as police cars passed nearby with sirens blaring. Oswald then ducked into the Texas Theatre without purchasing a ticket. The police were notified by the theater's cashier and responded by surrounding the theater. Oswald was arrested after a brief struggle. Twelve people who witnessed the shooting or its aftermath were mentioned in the Warren Report.

Domingo Benavides saw Tippit standing by the left door of his parked police car, and a man standing on the right side of the car. He then heard three shots and saw Tippit fall to the ground. Benavides stopped his pickup truck on the opposite side of the street from Tippit's car. He observed the shooter fleeing the scene and removing two spent cartridge cases from his gun as he left.

Benavides waited in his truck until the gunman disappeared, and then "a few minutes" more, before assisting Tippit. He then tried, unsuccessfully, to use the radio in Tippit's car to report the shooting to police headquarters. Then another, unidentified person used the radio in the car and reported the shooting to a police operator for the first time. After that, Ted Callaway, who was Benavides' boss at the used car lot and a former Marine, used the radio and reported the shooting, hearing in response that the police already knew about it.

Callaway testified that he had seen the shooter with the gun "in a raised pistol position", and shouted at him, but what the shooter responded was unintelligible. Helen Markham witnessed the shooting and then saw a man with a gun in his hand leave the scene. Markham identified Oswald as Tippit's killer in a police lineup she viewed that evening.

Barbara Davis and her sister-in-law Virginia Davis heard the shots and saw a man crossing their lawn, shaking his revolver, as if he were emptying it of cartridge cases. Later, the women found two cartridge cases near the crime scene and handed the cases over to police. Two other cartridge cases were handed to a policeman by Benavides. That evening, Barbara Davis and Virginia Davis were taken to a lineup and both Davises picked out Oswald as the man whom they had seen.

Taxicab driver William Scoggins testified that he was sitting nearby in his cab when he saw Tippit's police car pull up alongside a man on the sidewalk. Scoggins heard three or four shots and then saw Tippit fall to the ground. As Scoggins crouched behind his cab, the man passed within 12 feet of him, pistol in hand, muttering what sounded to him like, "poor dumb cop" or "poor damn cop". The next day, Scoggins viewed a police lineup and identified Oswald as the man whom he had seen with the pistol.

The Commission also named several other witnesses who were not at the scene of the murder, but who identified Oswald running between the murder scene and the Texas Theatre, where Oswald was subsequently arrested.

It was the unanimous testimony of expert witnesses before the Warren Commission that these spent cartridge cases were fired from the revolver in Oswald's possession to the exclusion of all other weapons.

Out of the four bullets recovered from Tippit's body, only one (according to Nicol) or none (according to Cunningham) (Note: Joseph D. Nicol and Cortlandt Cunningham were FBI expert witnesses concerning firearms and firearms identification.) could be positively identified as having been fired from Oswald's revolver; the others "could have" been fired from that revolver, but there was no certain match. When the revolver was test-fired by the FBI, it was reported that it was leaving inconsistent microscopic markings on the bullets, i.e. two consecutive bullets fired from it could not be matched to each other. This was because the revolver had been rechambered for .38 Special but not rebarreled for .38 Special, so the bullets were slightly undersized compared to the barrel, making their passage through the barrel "erratic".

Extensive damage to the bullets and mutilation was noted. Later, the House Select Committee on Assassinations (HSCA) agreed with Cunningham's conclusion that none of the bullets found could be positively identified, or ruled out, as having been fired from Oswald's revolver. Still, when they test-fired the gun, they found that bullets fired from it could actually be matched to each other, if they were of the same type and manufacturer.

There was a discrepancy between the four cartridge cases (2 Western, 2 Remington-Peters) and the four bullets (3 Western-Winchester, 1 Remington-Peters) found; one of the proposed explanations was that Oswald fired five shots, and one bullet and one cartridge case were not found.

Upon his arrest and during subsequent questionings by police, Oswald denied any involvement in Tippit's murder. According to Captain Will Fritz, Oswald admitted he armed himself with a revolver before going to the theater. Detective Gus Rose recalled differently, saying that Oswald denied owning a revolver and claimed the cops had planted the revolver on him when they arrested him in the theater. Based on eyewitness' statements and the gun, Oswald was formally charged with the murder of Tippit at 7:10 p.m. on November 22. During the course of the day, police began to suspect that Oswald was also involved in the shooting of Kennedy. At approximately 1:00 am on November 23, Oswald was also charged with assassinating Kennedy. Oswald continued to maintain his innocence in connection with both murders. On November 24, while being transported from the Dallas City Jail to the Dallas County Jail, Oswald was shot and mortally wounded by Dallas nightclub owner Jack Ruby. The shooting was broadcast throughout the United States and Canada on live television.

As Oswald was killed before he was tried for either crime, President Lyndon B. Johnson commissioned a committee of US Senators, Congressmen and elder statesmen to investigate the events surrounding the deaths of Kennedy, Tippit, and Oswald in an effort to answer questions regarding the events. Johnson also hoped to quell rumors that arose after Oswald was shot by Ruby that the assassination and subsequent shootings were part of a conspiracy. The committee, known as the Warren Commission, named for the commission chairman, Chief Justice Earl Warren, spent ten months investigating the murders and interviewing witnesses. On September 24, 1964, the Warren Commission released an 888-page report that concluded there was no evidence of a conspiracy and Oswald had killed Kennedy and Tippit, acting alone. The report also concluded that Ruby acted alone in the killing of Oswald.

In 1979, the HSCA reported: "Based on Oswald's possession of the murder weapon a short time after the murder and the eyewitness identifications of Oswald as the gunman, the committee concluded that Oswald shot and killed Tippit."

=== Conspiracy theories ===
Some conspiracy theorists have alleged that the murder of Tippit was part of a conspiracy to kill Kennedy, implying that two murders could not have happened so closely together by coincidence. Warren Commission attorney David Belin referred to Tippit's killing as the "Rosetta Stone to the JFK assassination". Other conspiracy theorists suggest that Tippit's murder was unconnected to the assassination.

Some conspiracy theorists dispute that Oswald shot Tippit, alleging that the physical evidence and witness testimony do not support that conclusion. New Orleans district attorney Jim Garrison, who investigated the assassination of John F. Kennedy and brought evidence in his 1969 trial of businessman Clay Shaw, contended in his book On the Trail of the Assassins that the witness testimony and handling of evidence in the Tippit murder was flawed and that it was doubtful that Oswald was the killer or even at the scene of the crime. According to Garrison, numerous witnesses who were not interviewed by the Warren Commission reported seeing two men fleeing the scene of Tippit's murder.

Garrison claimed that Helen Markham, the Warren Commission's star witness, expressed uncertainty as to her identification of Oswald in the police lineup. Garrison claimed that bullets recovered from Tippit's body were from two different manufacturers, as the Warren Commission stated, and the gun found on Oswald at his arrest did not match the cartridges found at the scene. Garrison accused the Dallas Police Department of mishandling the evidence and of possibly firing Oswald's revolver to produce bullet cartridges for the FBI to link to his gun.

Other conspiracy theorists allege that Tippit himself was a conspirator, tasked to kill Oswald by organized crime or right-wing politicians in order to cover up the search for other assassins, and that Oswald killed him in self-defense.

== Aftermath ==
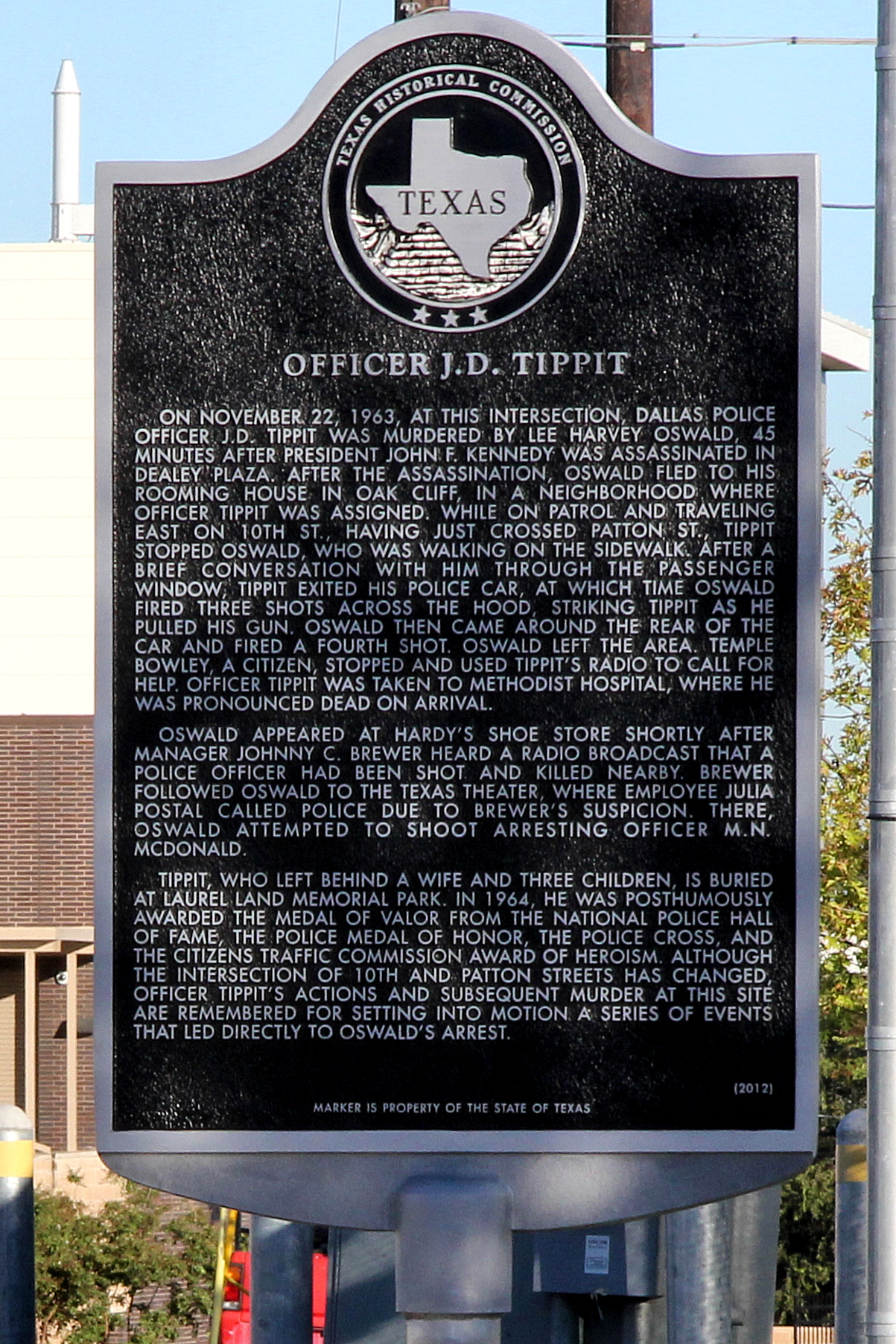
Texas historical marker at 10th Street and Patton Avenue in Dallas

On the evening of the assassination, both Attorney General Robert F. Kennedy and the new president, Lyndon B. Johnson, called Tippit's widow to express their sympathies. Jacqueline Kennedy wrote a letter expressing sorrow for the bond they shared. The plight of Tippit's family also moved much of the nation and a total of $647,579 was donated to them, equivalent to $6,810,138 in 2025, following the assassination. One of the largest individual gifts was $25,000 that Dallas businessman Abraham Zapruder donated to Marie Tippit after selling his film of the president's assassination to Life magazine.

A televised funeral service for Tippit was held on November 25, 1963, at the Beckley Hills Baptist Church, attended by about 2,000 people, at least 800 of them police colleagues. Police outriders attended the hearse on its way to the burial at the newly established Memorial Court of Honor at the Laurel Land Memorial Park in Dallas. His funeral was held on the same day as those of both Kennedy and Oswald.

In January 1964, Tippit was posthumously awarded the Medal of Valor from the American Police Hall of Fame, and he also received the Police Medal of Honor, the Police Cross, and the Citizens Traffic Commission Award of Heroism. A state historical marker memorializing Tippit was unveiled November 20, 2012, at the location where the shooting occurred.

== Personal life ==
Tippit married Marie Frances Gasway on December 26, 1946, and the couple had three children: Charles Allan (1950–2014), Brenda Kay (born 1953), and Curtis Glenn (1956–2026).

Tippit's widow married Dallas police lieutenant Harry Dean Thomas in January 1967. They were married until his death in 1982. Marie Tippit later married Carl Flinner; the marriage ended in divorce after which Marie resumed using the surname of Tippit. Marie died at 92 on March 2, 2021, after suffering from medical issues.

His distant cousin was the actor Wayne Tippit who appeared in two films about the Kennedy assassination, Running Against Time and JFK.

== In media ==
Fictional depictions of Tippit in literature include:

- He appears as a minor character in the 1988 novel Libra.
- He serves as a minor character in the Stephen King novel 11/22/63.

On screen, Tippit has been played by: Two uncredited actors in 1977's The Trial of Lee Harvey Oswald and 1978's Ruby and Oswald.

- Price Carson (1991) – JFK
- David Duchovny (1992) – Ruby
- Mark Schooley (1996) (The X-Files, episode, "Musings of a Cigarette Smoking Man"
- Matt Micou (2013) – Killing Kennedy

== Sources ==
- The Torch Is Passed. New York: Associated Press. 1963.
- United Press International; American Heritage Magazine (1964). Four Days. New York: American Heritage Pub. Co.
- Warren Commission (1964). Report of the President's Commission on the Assassination of President John F. Kennedy. Washington, D.C.: United States Government Printing Office – via National Archives.
