= Sam Houston Clinton =

American judge

- Born: September 17, 1923; Waco, Texas
- Died: October 5, 2004 (aged 81); Austin, Texas
- Education: Baylor University
- Occupation: Lawyer
- Political party: Democrat

Sam Houston Clinton, Jr. (September 17, 1923 – October 5, 2004) was a judge in the Texas Court of Criminal Appeals, who as a lawyer represented both atheist leader Madalyn Murray O'Hair and Jack Ruby, the man who shot and killed presidential assassin Lee Harvey Oswald.

== Early life ==
Clinton, was born in Waco, Texas, the son of a cotton broker. He graduated from Baylor University and served in World War II as a naval aviator. He graduated from Baylor Law School in 1948. He was an aide to congressman W.R. "Bob" Poage of Texas from 1949 to 1950 and an attorney for the National Labor Relations Board in 1951. He also worked at the Federal Bureau of Investigation's fingerprint department.

== Career ==
As a lawyer in Austin, Texas from 1959 to 1979, Clinton was general counsel to the Texas AFL-CIO and the Texas Civil Liberties Union. He was able to get the guilty verdict against Jack Ruby, the Dallas nightclub owner who killed Lee Harvey Oswald on national television, reversed on appeal, based on procedural errors. A change of venue was asked for and granted and a new trial was set for February 1967, in Wichita Falls, Texas. Ruby, meanwhile, had died of cancer while in prison. In addition to representing O'Hair, Clinton won a lawsuit to desegregate women's dormitories at the University of Texas at Austin in the late 1960s.

== Judgeship ==
Clinton was elected to the Texas Court of Criminal Appeals in 1978. Clinton served three consecutive six-year terms on the state's highest criminal court. His 1,094 opinions were the second-most ever written by a judge on the court. He retired in 1996.

== Death ==
On October 5, 2004, Judge Clinton died, at the age of 81, of Alzheimer's disease at a retirement home in Austin, Texas.
