= Joe H. Tonahill =

- Born: Joe Halbert Tonahill Sr. 1914; Hughes Springs, Texas, U.S.
- Died: 2001 (aged 86–87); Houston, Texas, U.S.
- Education: University of Texas; George Washington University
- Occupation: Lawyer
- Spouse: Violett Smith (m. 1941)

Joe H. Tonahill (1914–2001) was an American lawyer.

== Biography ==
Tonahill was born in Hughes Springs, Texas. He was a graduate of the University of Texas and George Washington University. He married Violett Smith, daughter of congressman Howard W. Smith in 1941.

During his career, he worked on Jack Ruby and Melvin Belli's cases. He was the co-founder of the International Academy of Trial Lawyers and the Texas Trial Lawyers Association. He was also a wrestler.

Posthumously, he was inducted to the Trial Lawyer Hall of Fame in 2018. Joe Tonahill Award is named after him.
