= L. C. Graves =

American police detective (1918–1995)

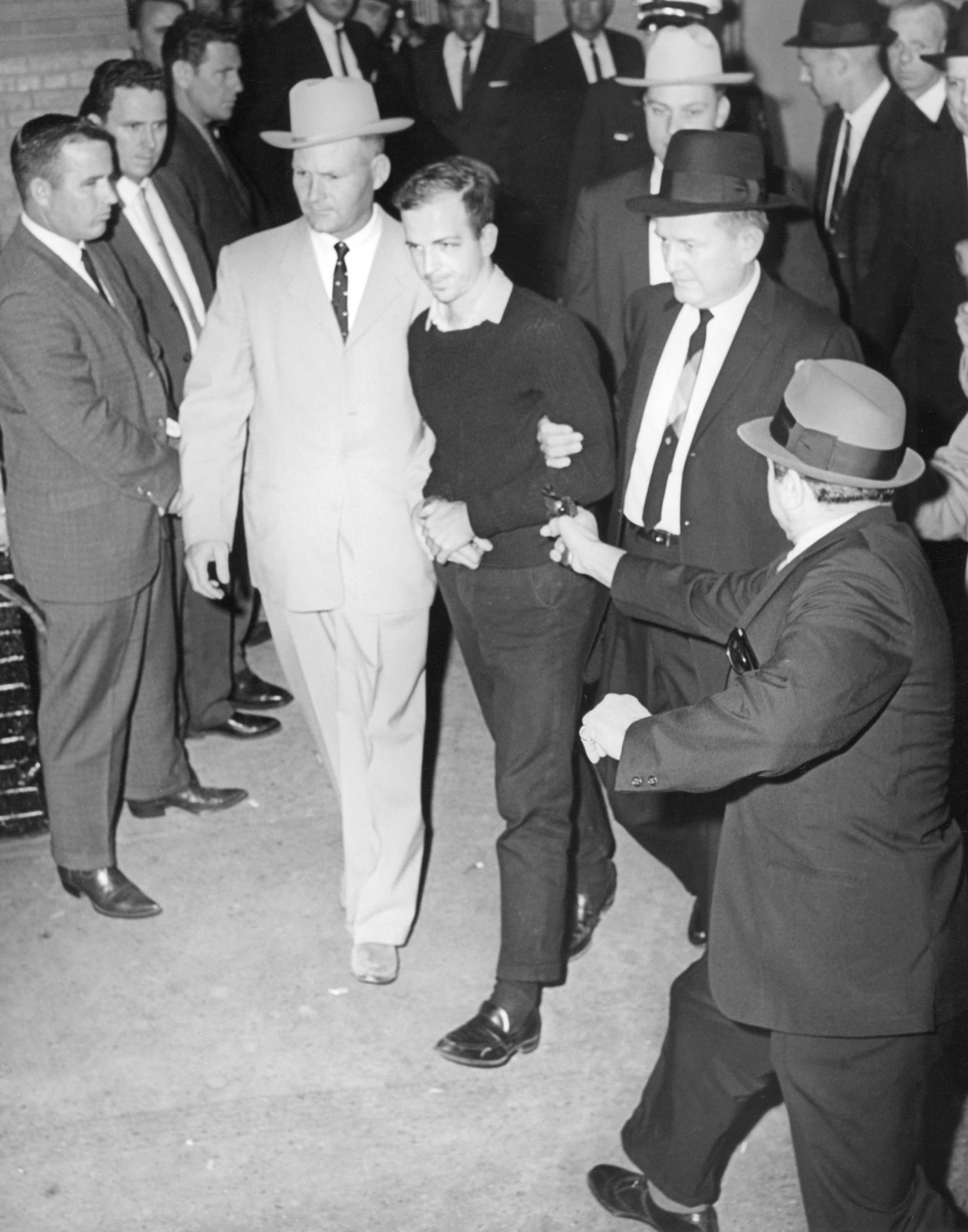
- Graves (right with dark hat) with Jim Leavelle and Lee Harvey Oswald
- Born: October 8, 1918; Camp County, Texas, U.S.
- Died: February 11, 1995 (aged 76); Kaufman, Texas, U.S.
- Occupation: Police detective
- Spouse: Myrt Graves
- Children: 2

L. C. Graves (October 8, 1918 – February 11, 1995) was an American police detective who worked for the Dallas Police Department. He wrestled the gun from nightclub owner Jack Ruby after Ruby shot Lee Harvey Oswald, the suspected assassin of John F. Kennedy.

== Life and career ==
Graves was born in Camp County, Texas. He was the brother-in-law of police detective Paul Bentley. He served in the United States Army during World War II. After his discharge, he joined the Dallas Police Department in 1949. During his time in the police department, he worked as a detective in the Homicide and Robbery department.

On November 22, 1963, Graves and fellow detective Jim Leavelle were assigned as bodyguards for Lee Harvey Oswald, the suspected assassin of John F. Kennedy. After Oswald was shot by nightclub owner Jack Ruby, Graves wrestled the Colt Cobra revolver from Ruby's hand. He testified before the Warren Commission in March and April 1964. He retired from the police department in 1970.

== Death ==
Graves died on February 11, 1995, of heart failure at the Presbyterian Hospital in Kaufman, Texas, at the age of 76. He was buried at Grove Hill Cemetery.
