= David W. Belin =

American businessman

David William Belin (June 20, 1928 – January 17, 1999) was an attorney for the Warren Commission and the Rockefeller Commission. Belin was a partner in a Des Moines, Iowa law firm and, with former NBC News president Michael Gartner, was co-owner of The Tribune in Ames, Iowa.

== Early life ==
Belin was born in Washington, D.C. and raised in Sioux City, Iowa.

== Notable actions ==
Belin served the Jewish community in many leadership positions, establishing the Jewish Outreach Institute in 1987 after serving as chairman of the Union of American Hebrew Congregations' outreach commission. A successful businessman, Belin owned a number of Midwestern publications.

Belin attended the University of Michigan where he received a bachelor's degree in 1951, a master's degree in business in 1953, and a law degree in 1954. He began practicing law in Des Moines in 1954.

=== Government service ===
Belin served in the United States Army in Korea and in Japan. He was a concert violinist for a period of his service.

Belin served as staff counsel to the Warren Commission, which investigated President John F. Kennedy's assassination. The commission's report concluded that Lee Harvey Oswald acted entirely on his own as Kennedy's assassin.

Belin was hired by Lee Rankin, chief counsel to the commission, who assigned a team of two lawyers to each of the major areas for investigation. Belin and Joe Ball, a criminal defense lawyer from Los Angeles, shared the important task of investigating Oswald's activities during the assassination. As their work progressed, Belin focused his efforts on trying to prove that a second shooter had participated in the assassination, but detailed work by the FBI and analysis of the Zapruder film suggested that all of the shots that hit President Kennedy and Texas Governor John Connally originated from Oswald's position in the book depository.

At Robert Kennedy’s insistence, Chief Justice Earl Warren personally reviewed the evidence relating to President Kennedy’s medical treatment and autopsy. Because the photos were so gruesome, Warren prevented the staff attorneys from using the autopsy evidence to corroborate the testimony of medical witnesses. Belin described this decision as “disastrous” because it “gave rise to wild speculation and rumor” about the President's injuries. Belin believed that the Kennedy family's desire for privacy was outweighed by the public's need to know the facts about the assassination.

In 1968 he was Chairman of the 'Lawyers for Nixon' group. In January 1975, President Gerald Ford, a former Warren Commission member, appointed Belin to serve as executive director of the Rockefeller Commission, which investigated illegal activities of the Central Intelligence Agency. Belin led the Rockefeller Commission's effort to investigate and publicize the CIA's program to assassinate foreign officials. Under pressure from Belin, the CIA turned over records demonstrating the existence of these secret activities. When members of the commission, including Vice President Nelson Rockefeller, objected to further investigation, Belin used favorable press coverage to convince the commission to allow him to continue. Key CIA officials then testified about the agency's plans from 1960 to 1964 to assassinate Fidel Castro – plans that had not been disclosed to the Warren Commission. Based on this evidence, Belin prepared a draft chapter for the commission's report, but both Rockefeller and Secretary of State Henry Kissinger successfully opposed publication of this chapter. Belin was upset about this decision, but the evidence that he collected provided important support for the groundbreaking work of the Church Committee in 1975 and 1976.

In September 1981 he appeared on William F. Buckley's Firing Line alongside G. Robert Blakey to discuss the Warren Report. In 1988 he appeared in an episode of The Kwitny Report discussing the American mafia and Kennedy's assassination. Responding to Oliver Stone’s movie “JFK,” Belin delivered a major defense of the commission's work in a speech at the National Press Club in Washington, D.C., on March 26, 1992. He described “the lies, omissions, misrepresentations, and manufactured facts” in the film, and characterized Stone's work as an effort to impeach the integrity of Earl Warren, “a great Chief Justice.” Belin also noted the massive amount of money spent by film studios and television networks to generate controversy and profits “as they rewrite the truth” about the Kennedy assassination.

Belin wrote two books on the JFK Assassination: November 22, 1963: You Are the Jury (1973) and Final Disclosure: The Full Truth About the Assassination of President Kennedy (1988).

Belin stood by the findings of the Warren Commission's report until his death, and was known to become incensed at any mention of an assassination conspiracy. As he lay in a coma in his final days, his friends would whisper conspiracy theories about the JFK assassination into his ear to confirm his unconsciousness by his unprecedented lack of response.

=== Belin Lectureship ===
In 1991, Belin established the David W. Belin Lectureship in American Jewish Affairs at his alma mater the University of Michigan as an academic forum for the discussion of contemporary Jewish life in the United States. Belin graduated from the University of Michigan's College of Literature, Science and the Arts, Business School and Law School.

Past Belin lecturers have included Egon Mayer (sociologist), Stephen J. Whitfeld, Arthur Green, Deborah Dash Moore, Alvin Rosenfeld, Paula Hyman, Jeffrey S. Gurock, Arnold Eisen, Sylvia Barack Fishman, Jonathan Sarna, Hasia Diner, Susan Martha Kahn, Riv-Ellen Prell, Andrew Heinze, and Fred Lazin. The Belin lectures have been published annually by the University of Michigan Frankel Center for Judaic Studies.

== Later years and death ==
Belin lived in Windsor Heights, Iowa and on Manhattan's East Side. In January 1999, he sustained head injuries in a fall in a Rochester, Minnesota hotel room. Belin was in a coma before dying twelve days later on January 17.
