= John F. Kennedy assassination conspiracy theories =

American political controversy

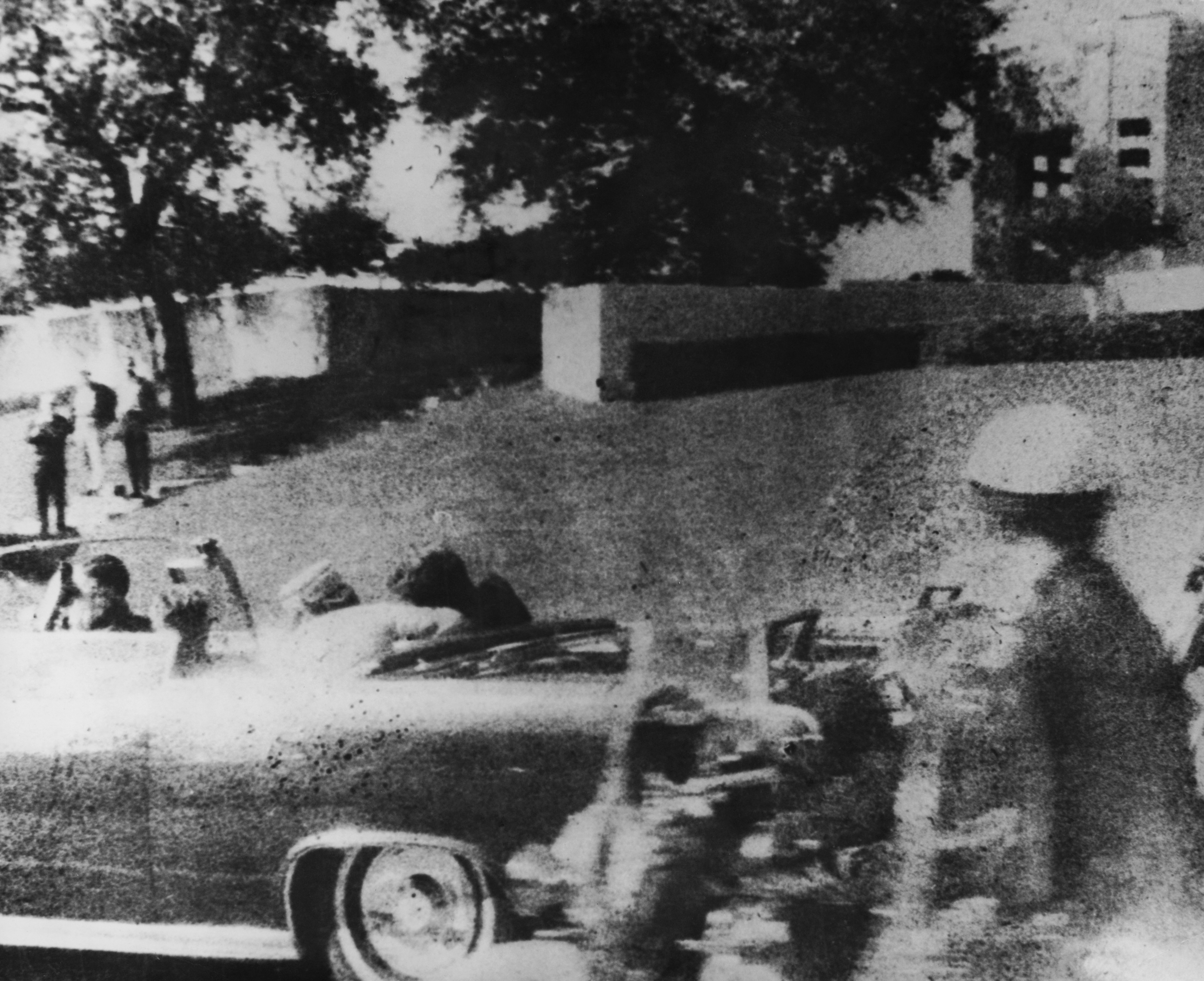
The Moorman photograph, taken a fraction of a second after Kennedy was fatally shot, has been a subject of intense scrutiny. Some conspiracy theories believe that Kennedy's assassin is visible in the background

The assassination of John F. Kennedy, the 35th president of the United States, on November 22, 1963, has spawned numerous conspiracy theories. These theories allege the involvement of the Central Intelligence Agency (CIA), the Mafia, Vice President Lyndon B. Johnson, Cuban prime minister Fidel Castro, the KGB, or some combination of these individuals and entities.

Some conspiracy theories have alleged a coverup by parts of the American federal government, such as the original investigators within the Federal Bureau of Investigation (FBI), the Warren Commission, or the CIA. The lawyer and author Vincent Bugliosi estimated that a total of 42 groups, 82 assassins, and 214 individuals had been accused at one time or another in various conspiracy scenarios.

== Background ==
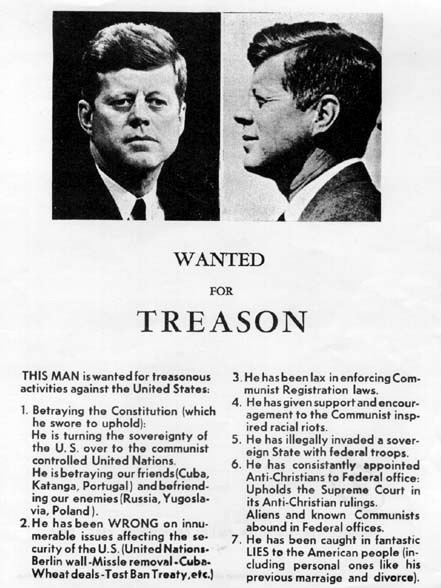
A handbill circulated on November 21, 1963, one day before the assassination

On November 22, 1963, President John F. Kennedy was assassinated while traveling in a motorcade in an open-top limousine in Dallas, Texas. Lee Harvey Oswald was arrested for the murder of a Dallas policeman named J. D. Tippit and arraigned for both murders. On November 24, a nightclub owner named Jack Ruby shot and killed Oswald.

Immediately after Kennedy was shot, many people suspected that the assassination was part of a larger plot, and broadcasters speculated that Dallas right-wingers were involved. Ruby's murder of Oswald compounded initial suspicions. The author Mark Lane has been described as firing "the first literary shot" with his article "Defense Brief for Oswald" in the National Guardian's December 19, 1963, issue. Thomas Buchanan's book Who Killed Kennedy?, published in May 1964, has been credited as the first book to allege a conspiracy.

In 1964, after being appointed by President Lyndon B. Johnson, the Warren Commission concluded that Oswald had acted alone and that no credible evidence supported the contention that he was involved in a conspiracy to assassinate the president. The Commission indicated that Secretary of State Dean Rusk, Defense Secretary Robert S. McNamara, Treasury Secretary C. Douglas Dillon, Attorney General Robert F. Kennedy, FBI director J. Edgar Hoover, CIA director John A. McCone, and Secret Service chief James J. Rowley each individually reached the same conclusion on the basis of information available to them. During the trial of Clay Shaw in 1969, New Orleans District Attorney Jim Garrison challenged the single-bullet theory, claiming that the Zapruder film indicated that the fatal shot to Kennedy's head was fired from the "grassy knoll", a small hill that featured prominently in later conspiracy theories.

In 1979, the United States House Select Committee on Assassinations (HSCA) agreed with the Warren Commission that Oswald killed Kennedy but concluded that the commission's report and the original FBI investigation were seriously flawed. The HSCA concluded that at least four shots were fired, with a "high probability" that two gunmen fired at Kennedy, and that a conspiracy was probable. The HSCA stated that the Warren Commission had "failed to investigate adequately the possibility of a conspiracy to assassinate the President".

Documents under Section 5 of the President John F. Kennedy Assassination Records Collection Act of 1992 were required to be released within 25 years of October 26, 1992. Most of the documents were released on October 26, 2017. A provision of the 1992 act allows a President to extend the deadline, and President Donald Trump set a new deadline of October 26, 2021, for the remaining documents to be released. In October 2021, President Joe Biden further extended the deadline to December 15, 2022, citing delays related to the COVID-19 pandemic. On December 15, 2022, NARA released an additional 13,173 documents as ordered by President Biden. In June 2023, it was reported that NARA had completed the review of the documents with 99% of all documents having been made public. Following his return to office on January 23, 2025, President Trump issued an executive order directing the further release of documents related to the assassination, as well as the assassinations of Martin Luther King Jr., and Robert F. Kennedy, with documents expected to be released later in 2025 and afterward.

=== Public opinion ===
According to John C. McAdams, "The greatest and grandest of all conspiracy theories is the Kennedy assassination conspiracy theory." Others have referred to it as "the mother of all conspiracies". Author David Krajicek describes Kennedy assassination enthusiasts as people belonging to "conspiracy theorists" on one side and "debunkers" on the other. The great amount of controversy surrounding the event has resulted in bitter disputes between those who support the conclusion of the Warren Commission and those who reject it or are critical of the official explanation, with each side leveling accusations toward the other of "naivete, cynicism, and selective interpretation of the evidence".

The number of books written about the assassination of Kennedy has been estimated to be between 1,000 and 2,000. According to Vincent Bugliosi, 95 percent of those books are "pro-conspiracy and anti-Warren Commission". Very few of the books and articles published about the assassination have been written by historians. Calvin Trillin's article, "The Buffs" in the June 1967 edition of The New Yorker, has been credited as the first addressing the "conspiracy phenomenon".

Trillin described those who criticized the Warren Report: "They tend to refer to themselves (and the professionals) as 'investigators' or 'researchers' or, most often, 'critics'. They are also known as 'assassination buffs'." Professor of History Colin Kidd also described amateur historians of the assassination as "buffs". Kidd said: "The study of Kennedy's assassination is now best known to academics as a counterculture, which grossly caricatures the best practices of the academy and where extravagant theories tend to trump sound scholarship, plausibility, and common sense."

Public opinion polls have consistently shown that most Americans believe that there was a conspiracy to kill Kennedy. These same polls show no agreement on who else may have been involved in the shooting. The National Opinion Research Center, conducted 1,384 in-person interviews between November 26, 1963, and December 3, 1963, and found that 62 percent believed that others were involved in the assassination, compared with 24 percent who believed that only one person was involved.

In ten polls conducted from 1963 through 2023, Gallup found that the percentage of U.S. adults that did not believe that Oswald had acted alone increased from 52% in 1963 and 50% in 1966 to between 74% and 81% from 1976 through 2003 and then declined to 61% in 2013 and 65% in 2023. Arthur Lehman Goodhart dismissed the relevance of the polls in a 1968 article for the Alberta Law Review: "such a Gallup poll cannot prove anything except that the people often believe nonsense."

In 2003, an ABC News poll found that 70 percent of respondents suspected that the assassination involved more than one person. In 2009, 76 percent of people polled for CBS News said that they believed that Kennedy had been killed as the result of a conspiracy. In 2023, a YouGov poll found that 54% of U.S. adults surveyed believed Oswald definitely or probably did not act alone in the assassination.

=== Views of those close to Kennedy ===
Kennedy's youngest brother, Ted Kennedy, wrote that he had been fully briefed by Chief Justice Earl Warren during the initial investigation, and was "satisfied that the Warren Commission got it right". He stated that their middle brother Robert F. Kennedy was a "strong advocate for the accuracy of the report" and that it was his belief upon all of their discussions that he too accepted the Commission's findings. Kennedy's nephew Robert F. Kennedy Jr. believes that his uncle was killed in a conspiracy, and he endorsed the James W. Douglass book JFK and the Unspeakable whose central thesis is that Kennedy was a Cold Warrior who turned to peacemaking and that he was killed by his own security apparatus as a result. He said that his father publicly supported the Warren Commission but privately called it a "shoddy piece of craftsmanship", and was "fairly convinced" that others were involved in his brother's death besides Oswald.

== Circumstantial evidence of a cover-up ==
=== Background ===
After Oswald's death, FBI director J. Edgar Hoover wrote a memo detailing that the Dallas Police would not have had enough evidence against Oswald without the FBI's information. He then wrote: "The thing I am concerned about, and so is [Deputy Attorney General] Mr. Katzenbach, is having something issued so we can convince the public that Oswald is the real assassin." Top government and intelligence officials were also finding that, according to CIA intercepts, someone had impersonated Oswald in phone calls and visits made to the Soviet and Cuban embassies in Mexico City several weeks before the assassination. Over the next 40 years, this became one of the CIA's most closely guarded secrets on the Oswald case. Anne Goodpasture, a CIA officer, admitted in sworn testimony that she had disseminated the tapes of these phone calls herself. She had earlier denied to congressional investigators in 1970 that she had any knowledge of recordings of Oswald's phone calls.

On November 23, 1963, the day after the assassination, Hoover's preliminary analysis of the assassination included the following:

The Central Intelligence Agency advised that on October 1st, 1963, an extremely sensitive source had reported that an individual identifying himself as Lee Oswald contacted the Soviet Embassy in Mexico City inquiring as to any messages. Special agents of this Bureau, who have conversed with Oswald in Dallas, Texas, have observed photographs of the individual referred to above and have listened to a recording of his voice. These special agents are of the opinion that the referred-to individual was not Lee Harvey Oswald.

That same day, Hoover had this conversation with President Johnson:

Johnson: "Have you established any more about the [Oswald] visit to the Soviet Embassy in Mexico in September?"

Hoover: "No, there's one angle that's very confusing for this reason. We have up here the tape and the photograph of the man at the Soviet Embassy, using Oswald's name. That picture and the tape do not correspond to this man's voice, nor to his appearance. In other words, it appears that there was a second person who was at the Soviet Embassy."

President Lyndon B. Johnson expressed concern that the public might come to believe that Soviet leader Nikita Khrushchev and/or Cuban leader Fidel Castro was implicated in the assassination—a situation that Johnson said might lead to "a war that [could] kill 40 million Americans in an hour". Johnson relayed his concern to both Chief Justice Earl Warren and Senator Richard Russell Jr., telling them that they could "serve America" by joining the commission Johnson had established to investigate the assassination, which would later become known unofficially as the Warren Commission.

Katzenbach wrote a memorandum to Lyndon Johnson aide Bill Moyers that said, among other things, that the results of the FBI's investigation should be made public. Katzenbach suggested that a commission be formed, composed of people with "impeccable integrity", to conduct a complete investigation of the assassination. Katzenbach wrote: "Speculation about Oswald's motivation ought to be cut off, and we should have some basis for rebutting thought that this was a Communist conspiracy or (as the Iron Curtain press is saying) a right–wing conspiracy to blame it on the Communists. ... The public must be satisfied that Oswald was the assassin; that he did not have confederates who are still at large; and that the evidence was such that he would have been convicted at trial." Four days after Katzenbach's memo, Johnson formed the Warren Commission with Warren as chairman and Russell as a member.

=== Alleged inconsistencies ===
Numerous researchers, including author Mark Lane, Henry Hurt, Michael L. Kurtz, Gerald D. McKnight, Anthony Summers, and Harold Weisberg, have referred to what they see as inconsistencies, oversights, exclusions of evidence, errors, changing stories, or changes made to witness testimony in the official Warren Commission investigation, which they say could suggest a cover-up. Walter Cronkite, CBS News anchor, said, "Although the Warren Commission had full power to conduct its own independent investigation, it permitted the FBI and the CIA to investigate themselves—and so cast a permanent shadow on the answers."

United States Senator and U.S. Senate Select Committee on Intelligence member Richard Schweiker said, "The fatal mistake the Warren Commission made was to not use its own investigators, but instead to rely on the CIA and FBI personnel, which played directly into the hands of senior intelligence officials who directed the cover-up." Schweiker told author Anthony Summers in 1978 that he "believe[d] that the Warren Commission was set up at the time to feed pablum to the American public for reasons not yet known, and that one of the biggest cover-ups in the history of our country occurred at that time".

In 1966, Roscoe Drummond voiced skepticism about a cover-up in his syndicated column, saying, "If there were a conspiracy to cover up the truth about the assassination, it would have to involve the Chief Justice, the Republican, Democratic, and non-party members of the commission, the FBI, the CIA, the Secret Service, the distinguished doctors of the armed services—and the White House—a conspiracy so multiple and complex that it would have fallen of its own weight."

== Allegations of witness tampering, intimidation, and foul play ==
=== Alleged witness intimidation ===
Richard Buyer wrote that many witnesses whose statements pointed to a conspiracy were either ignored or intimidated by the Warren Commission. In JFK: The Last Dissenting Witness, a 1992 biography of Jean Hill, Bill Sloan wrote that Warren Commission assistant counsel Arlen Specter attempted to humiliate, discredit, and intimidate Hill into changing her story. Hill also told Sloan that she was abused by Secret Service agents, harassed by the FBI, and received death threats. A later book by Sloan, entitled JFK: Breaking the Silence, quotes several assassination eyewitnesses as saying that Warren Commission interviewers repeatedly cut short or stifled any comments casting doubt on the conclusion that Oswald had acted alone.

In his book Crossfire, Jim Marrs gives accounts of several people who said they were intimidated by either FBI agents or anonymous individuals into altering or suppressing what they knew regarding the assassination. Some of those individuals include Richard Carr, Acquilla Clemmons, Sandy Speaker, and A. J. Millican. Marrs wrote that Texas School Book Depository employee Joe Molina was "intimidated by authorities and lost his job soon after the assassination", and that witness Ed Hoffman was warned by an FBI agent that he "might get killed" if he revealed what he observed in Dealey Plaza on the day of the assassination. Warren Reynolds, who claimed that he saw and chased the man who shot Tippit, was himself shot in the head in January 1964, two days after first talking to the FBI. He survived, and later testified to the Warren Commission that in February 1964 someone attempted to kidnap his 10-year-old daughter. (Note: The Warren Commission never asked Reynolds what the man he saw was wearing, despite Reynolds saying he later learned that the man left his "coat" in a parking lot (in fact, a zipper jacket was found there).)

=== Witness deaths ===
The idea that witnesses to the Kennedy assassination met mysterious or suspicious deaths because they knew things that conspirators did not want to be revealed has been referred to by author Vincent Bugliosi as "one of the very most popular and durable myths". Allegations of mysterious or suspicious deaths of witnesses connected with the Kennedy assassination originated with journalist Penn Jones Jr. On the third anniversary of the assassination, Ramparts published an editorial by Jones, along with a handful of articles that he had written earlier for his newspaper, the Midlothian Mirror. Jones reported that there were six men who had met in Jack Ruby's apartment the night after Ruby shot Oswald. Of the six men, Jones noted that three of them had since died: reporter Jim Koethe, reporter Bill Hunter, and Ruby's first attorney, Tom Howard. Jones described these three deaths as "mysterious".

In a second article in the same issue, Jones reported on the deaths of seven other individuals who died within three years of the assassination: Earlene Roberts, Nancy Jane Mooney, Hank Killam, William Whaley, Edward Benavides, Dorothy Kilgallen, and Lee Bowers. Jones also described these deaths as "mysterious". Jones' article in Ramparts was picked up by Reuters, as well as various other news outlets. Time stated "the Ramparts-Jones non-history is riddled with factual errors and perverse conclusions" and offered examples to support its assessment.

In 1973, similar claims about suspicious deaths of witnesses were brought to national attention by the theatrically released movie Executive Action. In 1989, Jim Marrs published a list of 103 people he believed had died "convenient deaths" under suspicious circumstances. He observed that the deaths were grouped around investigations conducted by the Warren Commission, New Orleans District Attorney Jim Garrison, the Senate Intelligence Committee, and the House Select Committee on Assassinations. Marrs commented that "these deaths certainly would have been convenient for anyone not wishing the truth of the JFK assassination to become public." In 2013, Richard Belzer published Hit List: An In-Depth Investigation into the Mysterious Deaths of Witnesses to the JFK Assassination that examines the deaths of 50 people linked to the assassination and claims most of them were murdered as part of a cover-up.

Journalist Dorothy Kilgallen was publicly skeptical of the official version of the assassination of President Kennedy and Ruby's shooting of Lee Oswald. During 1964 and 1965, she wrote several newspaper articles on the subject and many relevant short items in her daily column. On February 23, 1964, the New York City newspaper New York Journal-American, where Kilgallen had worked since its formation in 1937, published her article about a conversation she had had with Ruby, when he was seated at his defense table during a recess in his murder trial. Whether Kilgallen and Ruby had a second conversation in a private room in the Dallas County, Texas, courthouse several days later has been disputed. If they did, she never wrote about it for publication. One of Kilgallen's biographers, Mark Shaw, contends that even if Ruby did not reveal sensitive information to Kilgallen about the assassination, she still could have learned sensitive information during a trip she made to New Orleans several weeks before she died.

Kilgallen's last brief item about the Kennedy assassination, published on September 3, 1965, ended with these words: "That story isn't going to die as long as there's a real reporter alive – and there are a lot of them alive." Two months later, on November 8, 1965, Kilgallen was found dead in her Manhattan townhouse. Her death was determined to have been caused by a combination of alcohol and barbiturates.

In his book Reclaiming History, Vincent Bugliosi referred to Kilgallen's 1965 death as "perhaps the most prominent mysterious death" cited by assassination researchers. However, Bugliosi questioned many of the claims made by Kilgallen. He also insisted that the presence of Kilgallen's husband and son in their five-story townhouse throughout the night when she died proved that she could not have been murdered. Bugliosi said an intruder would have awakened her husband or her eleven-year-old son and then her husband would have called the police.

According to author Jerome Kroth, Mafia figures Sam Giancana, John Roselli, Carlos Prio, Jimmy Hoffa, Charles Nicoletti, Leo Moceri, Richard Cain, Salvatore Granello, and Dave Yaras were likely murdered to prevent them from revealing their knowledge. According to author Matthew Smith, others with some tie to the case who have died suspicious deaths include Lee Bowers, Gary Underhill, William C. Sullivan, David Ferrie, Clay Shaw, George de Mohrenschildt, four showgirls who worked for Ruby, and Ruby himself.

The House Select Committee on Assassinations investigated another alleged mysterious death – that of Rose Cheramie (sometimes spelled Cherami), whose real name was Melba Christine Marcades. The Committee reported that Louisiana State Police Lieutenant Francis Fruge traveled to Eunice, Louisiana, on November 20, 1963 – two days before the assassination – to pick up Cheramie, who had sustained minor injuries when she was hit by a car. Fruge drove Cheramie to the hospital, and said that on the way there she "related to [him] that she was coming from Florida to Dallas with two men who were Italians or resembled Italians". Fruge asked her what she planned to do in Dallas, to which she replied: "... [N]umber one, pick up some money, pick up [my] baby, and ... kill Kennedy." Cheramie was admitted and treated at the state hospital in Jackson, Louisiana, for alcoholism and heroin addiction. After the assassination, Lt. Fruge contacted Dallas Police Captain Will Fritz regarding what he had learned from Cheramie but Fritz told him he "wasn't interested".

In the 1970s, state hospital physician Victor Weiss told a House Select Committee on Assassinations investigator that on November 25 – three days after the assassination – one of his fellow physicians told him that Cheramie had "stated before the assassination that President Kennedy was going to be killed". Weiss further reported that Cheramie told him after the assassination that she had worked for Ruby and that her knowledge of the assassination originated from "word in the underworld". Cheramie was found dead close to a highway near Big Sandy, Texas, on September 4, 1965; she had been run over by a car.

Concerning the Tippit shooting, the Warren Commission named 12 witnesses to the shooting and its aftermath. One of these witnesses, Warren Reynolds, was shot in the head 2 months after the Tippit shooting, but survived. Another witness, Domingo Benavides, who was close to the shooting and saw Tippit fall after being shot, lost his brother 15 months after the Tippit shooting; Benavides' brother was shot in the head in a bar and died.

The House Select Committee on Assassinations investigated the allegation "that a statistically improbable number of individuals with some direct or peripheral association with the Kennedy assassination died as a result of that assassination, thereby raising the specter of conspiracy". The committee's chief of research testified: "Our final conclusion on the issue is that the available evidence does not establish anything about the nature of these deaths which would indicate that the deaths were in some manner, either direct or peripheral, caused by the assassination of President Kennedy or by any aspect of the subsequent investigation."

Author Gerald Posner said that Marrs's list was taken from the group of about 10,000 people connected even in the most tenuous way to the assassination, including people identified in the official investigations, as well as the research of conspiracy theorists. Posner also said that it would be surprising if a hundred people out of ten thousand did not die in "unnatural ways". He observed that over half of the people on Marrs's list did not die mysteriously but of natural causes, such as Secret Service agent Roy Kellerman, who died of heart failure at age 69 in 1984, long after the Kennedy assassination, but is on Marrs's list as someone whose cause of death is "unknown". Posner also cited the fact many prominent witnesses and conspiracy researchers continue to live long lives.

== Allegations of evidence suppression, tampering, and fabrication ==
Many of those who believe in a JFK assassination conspiracy also believe that evidence against Oswald was either planted, forged, or tampered with.

=== Suppression of evidence ===
==== Ignored testimony ====
Some researchers assert that witness statements indicating a conspiracy were ignored by the Warren Commission. Josiah Thompson stated that the Commission ignored the testimony of seven eyewitnesses who said they saw smoke in the vicinity of the grassy knoll at the time of the assassination, as well as an eighth witness who said he smelled gunpowder. Jim Marrs wrote that the Commission did not seek the testimony of eyewitnesses on the triple underpass whose statements pointed to a shooter on the grassy knoll.

==== Confiscated film and photographs ====
In 1978, Gordon Arnold told the Dallas Morning News that he had filmed the assassination from the grassy knoll and that he gave the film to a policeman who was waving a shotgun. Arnold said that he had been afraid to report the incident due to claims of "peculiar" deaths of witnesses to the assassination. Ten years later, he told producers for Nigel Turner's The Men Who Killed Kennedy that the film was taken from him.

Another witness, identified as Beverly Oliver, came forward in 1970 and said she was the "Babushka Lady" who is seen, in the Zapruder film, filming the motorcade. She also said that after the assassination, she was contacted at work by two men whom she thought "... were either FBI or Secret Service agents". According to Oliver, the men told her that they wanted to take her film, have it developed, and then return it to her within ten days. The agents took her film, but never returned it.

==== Withheld documents ====
Richard Buyer and others have complained that many documents pertaining to the assassination have been withheld over the years, including documents from investigations made by the Warren Commission, the House Select Committee on Assassinations, and the Church Committee. These documents individually included the President's autopsy records. Some documents still are not scheduled for release until 2029. Many documents were released during the mid-to-late 1990s by the Assassination Records Review Board (ARRB) under the President John F. Kennedy Assassination Records Collection Act of 1992. Some of the material released contains redacted sections. Tax return information, which identified employers and sources of income, has not yet been released.

The existence of several secret documents related to the assassination, as well as the long period of secrecy, suggests to some the possibility of a cover-up. One historian noted, "There exists widespread suspicion about the government's disposition of the Kennedy assassination records stemming from the beliefs that Federal officials (1) have not made available all Government assassination records (even to the Warren Commission, Church Committee, House Assassination Committee) and (2) have heavily redacted the records released under FOIA in order to cover up sinister conspiracies."

According to the ARRB, "All Warren Commission records, except those records that contain tax return information, are (now) available to the public with only minor redactions." In response to a Freedom of Information Act request filed by journalist Jefferson Morley, the CIA stated in 2010 that it had over 1,100 documents in relation to the assassination, about 2,000 pages in total, that have not been released due to national security-related concerns.

=== Tampering with evidence ===
Some researchers have alleged that various items of physical evidence have been tampered with, including the "single bullet", also known as the "magic bullet" by some critics of official explanations, various bullet cartridges and fragments, the presidential limousine's windshield, the paper bag in which the Warren Commission said Oswald hid the rifle, the so-called "backyard" photos depicting Oswald holding the rifle, the Zapruder film, the photographs and radiographs obtained at Kennedy's autopsy, and the president's dead body itself.

==== Photographs ====
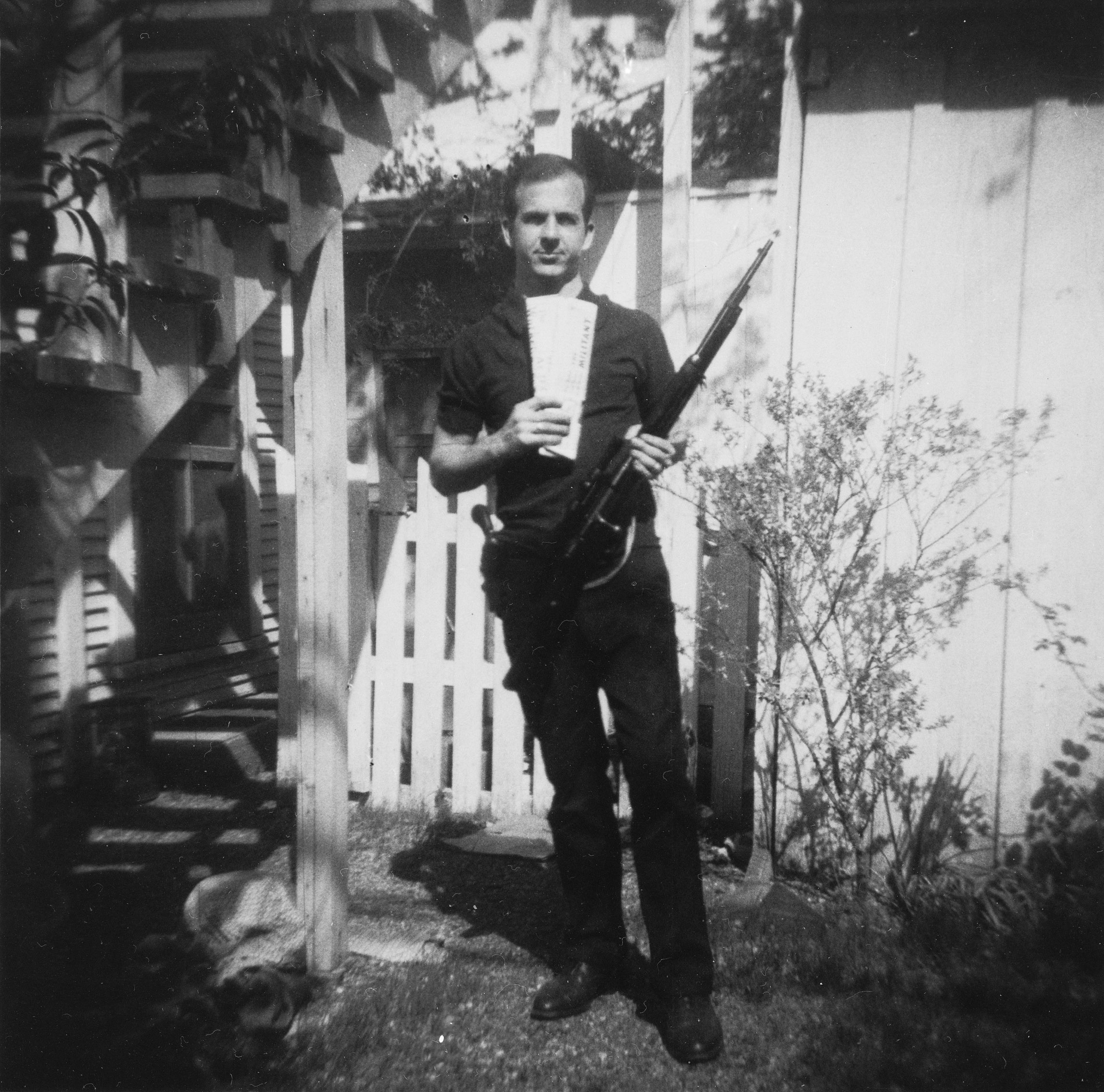
Oswald, carrying a rifle in his backyard, March 1963

Among the evidence against Oswald are photographs of him holding a Carcano rifle in his back yard, the weapon identified by the Warren Commission as the assassination weapon. The House Select Committee on Assassinations concluded that the Oswald photos are genuine and Oswald's wife Marina said that she took them. In 2009, the journal Perception published the findings of Hany Farid, a professor in the Department of Computer Science at Dartmouth College who used 3D modeling software to analyze one of the photographs. He demonstrated that a single light source could create seemingly incongruent shadows and concluded that the photograph revealed no evidence of tampering. Researcher Robert Groden asserts that these photos are fake.

Groden said in 1979 that four autopsy photographs showing the back of Kennedy's head were forged to hide a wound fired from a second gunman. According to Groden, a photograph of a cadaver's head was inserted over another depicting a large exit wound in the back of the president's head. HSCA chief counsel G. Robert Blakey stated that the "suggestion that the committee would participate in a cover-up is absurd" and that Groden was "not competent to make a judgment on whether a photograph has been altered". Blakey stated that the photographic analysis panel for the Committee had examined the photographs and that they "considered everything" that Groden had to say "and rejected it."

==== Zapruder film ====
The House Select Committee on Assassinations described the Zapruder film as "the best available photographic evidence of the number and timing of the shots that struck the occupants of the presidential limousine". The Assassination Records Review Board said it "is perhaps the single most important assassination record." According to Vincent Bugliosi, the film was "originally touted by the vast majority of conspiracy theorists as incontrovertible proof" of a conspiracy, but is now believed by many conspiracy theorists to be a "sophisticated forgery". (Note: Among those who believe that the Zapruder film has been altered are John Costella, James H. Fetzer, David Lifton, David Mantik, Jack White, Noel Twyman, and Harrison Livingstone, who has called it "the biggest hoax of the 20th century".)

Jack White, photographic consultant to the House Select Committee on Assassinations, claimed there were anomalies in the Zapruder film, including an "unnatural jerkiness of movement or change of focus… in certain frame sequences". In 1996, the Assassination Records Review Board asked Kodak product engineer Roland Zavada to undertake a thorough technical study of the Zapruder film. Zavada concluded that there was no detectable evidence of manipulation or image alteration on the film's original version.

Former senior official at the CIA's National Photographic Interpretation Center, Dino Brugioni, said that he and his team examined the 8mm Zapruder film of the John F. Kennedy assassination on the evening of Saturday November 23, 1963, and into the morning of Sunday November 24, 1963. In a 2011 interview with Douglas Horne of the Assassination Record Review Board, Brugioni said the Zapruder film in the National Archives today, and available to the public, has been altered from the version of the film he saw and worked with on November 23–24. Brugioni recalls seeing a "white cloud" of brain matter, three or four feet above Kennedy's head, and says that this "spray" lasted for more than one frame of the film. The version of the Zapruder film available to the public depicts the fatal head shot on only one frame of the film, frame 313. Additionally, Brugioni is certain that the set of briefing boards available to the public in the National Archives is not the set that he and his team produced on November 23–24, 1963.

==== Kennedy's body ====
In his 1980 book Best Evidence, author David Lifton presented the thesis that President Kennedy's dead body had been altered between the Dallas hospital and the autopsy site at Bethesda for the purpose of creating erroneous conclusions about the number and direction of the shots.

=== Fabrication of evidence ===
==== Murder weapon ====
The Warren Commission found that the shots that killed Kennedy and wounded Connally were fired from an Italian 6.5mm Manlicher Carcano rifle owned by Oswald. Deputy Sheriff Eugene Boone and Deputy Constable Seymour Weitzman both initially identified the rifle found in the Texas School Book Depository as a 7.65 German Mauser. Weitzman signed an affidavit the following day describing the weapon as a "7.65 Mauser bolt action equipped with a 4/18 scope, a thick leather brownish-black sling on it". Deputy Sheriff Roger Craig claimed that he saw "7.65 Mauser" stamped on the barrel of the weapon. When interviewed in 1968 by researcher Barry Ernest, Craig said: "I felt then and I still feel now that the weapon was a 7.65 German Mauser .... I was there. I saw it when it was first pulled from its hiding place, and I am not alone in describing it as a Mauser."

Dallas District Attorney Henry Wade told the press that the weapon found in the book depository was a 7.65 Mauser, and the media reported this. Investigators later identified the rifle as a 6.5mm Carcano. In Matrix for Assassination, author Richard Gilbride suggested that both weapons were involved in the assassination and that Dallas Police Captain Will Fritz and Lieutenant J. Carl Day both might have been conspirators. Addressing "speculation and rumors", the Warren Commission identified Weitzman as "the original source of the speculation that the rifle was a Mauser" and stated that "police laboratory technicians subsequently arrived and correctly identified the [murder] weapon as a 6.5 Italian rifle."

==== Bullets and cartridges ====
The Warren Commission determined that three bullets were fired at the presidential motorcade. One of the three bullets missed the vehicle entirely; another bullet hit President Kennedy and passed through his body before striking Governor Connally; and the third bullet was the fatal head shot to the President. Some people claim that the bullet that passed through President Kennedy's body and hit Governor Connally – dubbed by some critics of the Commission as the "magic bullet" – was missing too little mass to account for the total weight of bullet fragments later found by the doctors who operated on Connally at Parkland Hospital. Those making this claim included the governor's chief surgeon, Dr. Robert Shaw, as well as two of Kennedy's autopsy surgeons, Commander James Humes and Lt. Colonel Pierre Finck. In his book Six Seconds in Dallas, author Josiah Thompson took issue with this claim. Thompson added up the weight of the bullet fragments listed in the doctor reports and concluded that their total weight "could" have been less than the mass missing from the bullet.

With Connally's death in 1993, forensic pathologist Dr. Cyril Wecht and the Assassination Archives and Research Center petitioned Attorney General Janet Reno to recover the remaining bullet fragments from Connally's body, contending that the fragments would disprove the Warren Commission's single-bullet, single-gunman conclusion. The Justice Department replied that it "... would have [had] no legal authority to recover the fragments unless Connally's family gave [it] permission [to do so]." Connally's family refused permission.

== Allegations of multiple gunmen ==
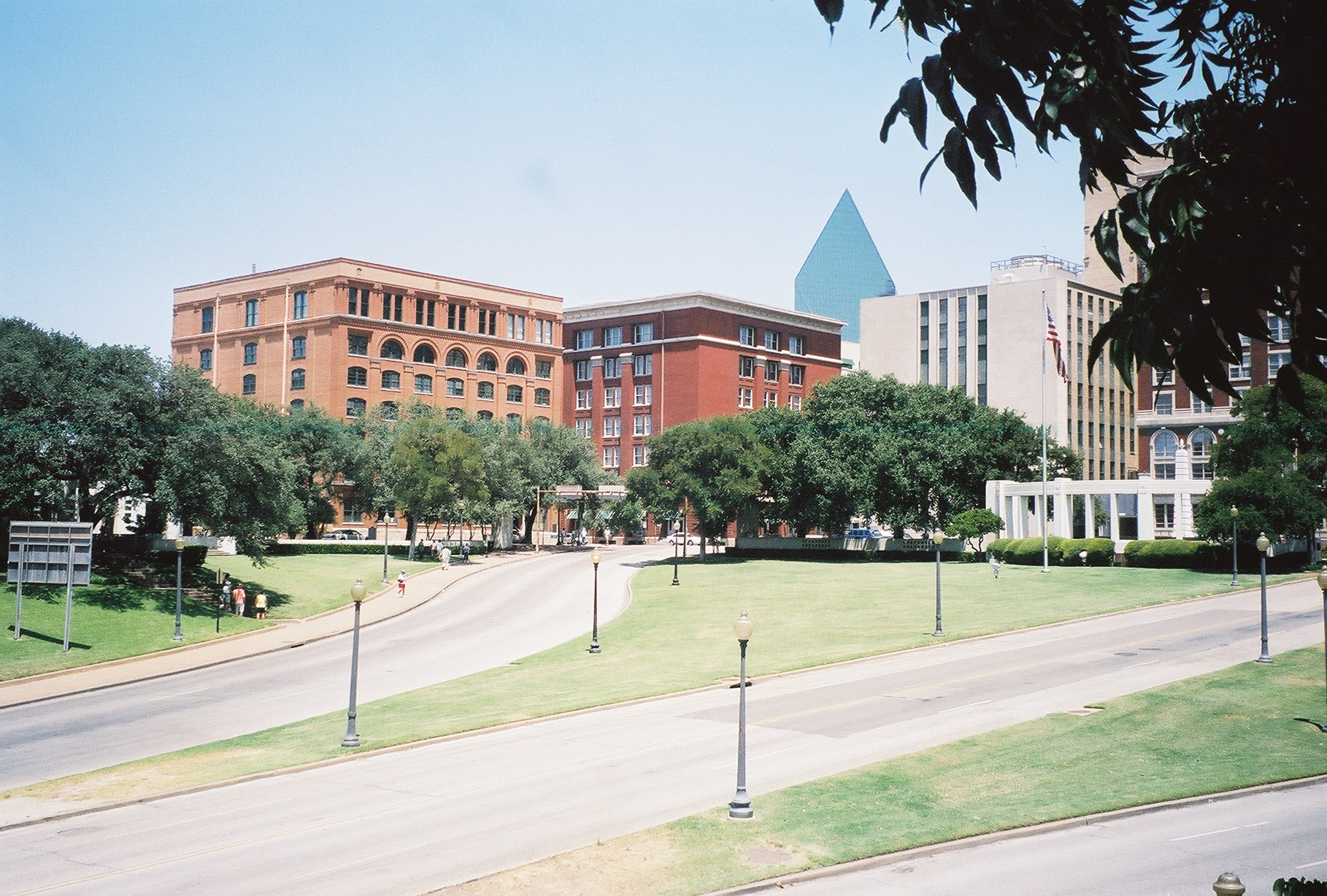
Dealey Plaza in 2003

The Warren Commission concluded that "three shots were fired from the Texas School Book Depository in a time period ranging from approximately 4.8 to in excess of 7 seconds." Some assassination researchers, including Josiah Thompson and Anthony Summers, dispute the Commission's findings. They point to evidence that brings into question the number of shots fired, the origin of the shots, and Oswald's ability to accurately fire three shots in such a short amount of time from such a rifle. These researchers suggest that multiple gunmen were involved.

=== Number of shots ===
Based on the "consensus among the witnesses at the scene" and "in particular the three spent cartridges" found near an open window on the sixth-floor of the Book Depository, the Warren Commission determined that "the preponderance of the evidence indicated that three shots were fired". In 1979, the House Select Committee on Assassinations concluded that there were four shots, one coming from the grassy knoll.

The Warren Commission, and later the House Select Committee on Assassinations, concluded that one of the shots hit President Kennedy in "the back of his neck", exited his throat, and struck Governor Connally in the back, exited the Governor's chest, shattered his right wrist, and implanted itself in his left thigh. This conclusion became known as the "single-bullet theory".

Mary Moorman said in a TV interview immediately after the assassination that there were either three or four shots close together, that shots were still being fired after the fatal shot, and that she was in the line of fire. In 1967, Josiah Thompson concluded from a close study of the Zapruder film and other forensic evidence, corroborated by the eyewitnesses, that four shots were fired in Dealey Plaza, with one wounding Connally and three hitting Kennedy.

On the day of the assassination, Nellie Connally was seated in the presidential car next to her husband, Texas Governor John Connally. In her book From Love Field: Our Final Hours, she said she believed that her husband was wounded by a bullet separate from the two that hit Kennedy.

=== Origin of the shots ===
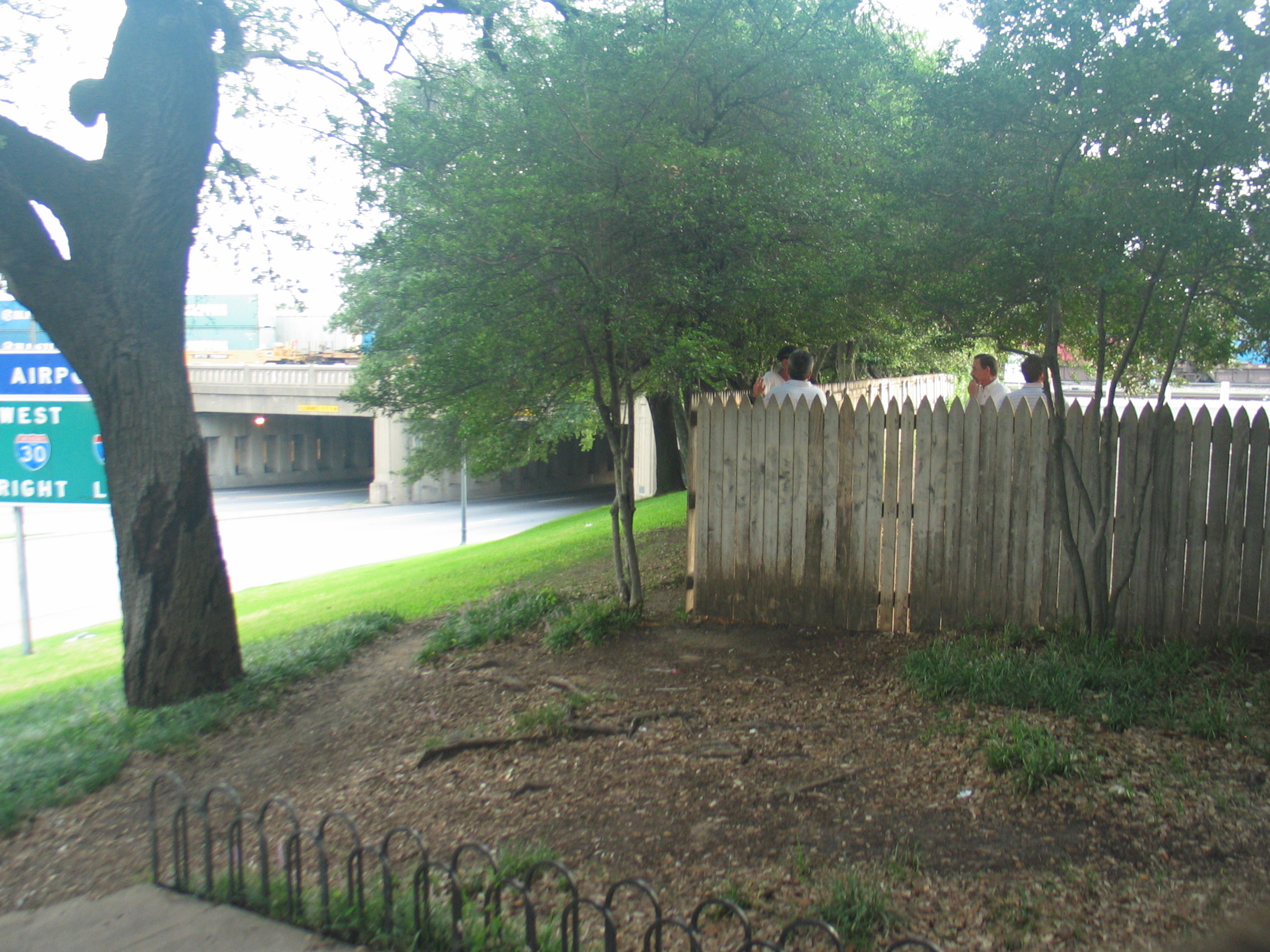
The wooden fence on the grassy knoll, where many conspiracy theorists believe another gunman stood

The Warren Commission concluded that all of the shots fired at President Kennedy came from the sixth-floor window at the southeast corner of the Texas School Book Depository. The Commission based its conclusion on the "cumulative evidence of eyewitnesses, firearms and ballistic experts and medical authorities", including onsite testing, as well as analysis of films and photographs conducted by the FBI and the US Secret Service.

In 1979, the House Select Committee on Assassinations agreed to publish a report from Warren Commission critic Robert Groden, in which he named "nearly [two] dozen suspected firing points in Dealey Plaza". These sites included multiple locations in or on the roof of the Texas School Book Depository, the Dal-Tex Building, the Dallas County Records Building, the triple overpass, a storm drain located along the north curb of Elm Street, and the Grassy Knoll. Josiah Thompson concluded that the shots fired at the motorcade came from three locations: the Texas School Book Depository, the Grassy Knoll, and the Records Building.

=== Testimony of witnesses ===
According to some researchers, the grassy knoll was identified by most witnesses as the area from where shots were fired. In March 1965, Harold Feldman wrote that there were 121 witnesses to the assassination listed in the Warren Report, 51 of whom indicated that the shots that killed Kennedy came from the grassy knoll, while 32 said the shots originated from the Texas School Book Depository. In 1967, Josiah Thompson examined the statements of 64 witnesses and concluded that 33 of them thought that the shots emanated from the grassy knoll. In 1966, Esquire magazine credited Feldman with "advanc[ing] the theory that there were two assassins: one on the grassy knoll and one in the Book Depository".

According to a 2021 article in Frontiers in Psychology, discrepancies in earwitness testimony regarding the origin of the gunshots have "contributed to the breadth and persistence of the conspiracy theories that had emerged since the assassination." Dennis McFadden with Center of Perceptual Systems at the University of Texas at Austin summarized: "Localizing the origin of a supersonic gunshot is not easy under optimal conditions. On the day of the JFK assassination, the earwitnesses present were startled, surprised, confused, disbelieving, excited, and likely scared, so there is little wonder that their perceptions were inconsistent, and with the passage of time, fluid. Once the confusing acoustics of supersonic bullets and the vagaries of human sound localization are taken into account, the widespread uncertainty amongst the earwitnesses to the assassination becomes more understandable."

Lee Bowers operated a railroad tower that overlooked the parking lot on the north side of the grassy knoll. When interviewed by the Warren Commission in 1964, he reported that he saw two men behind the grassy knoll's stockyard fence before the shooting took place. The men did not appear to be acting together or doing anything suspicious. After the shooting, Bowers said that one of the men remained behind the fence, but that he lost track of the second man whose clothing blended into the foliage. When interviewed by Mark Lane and Emile de Antonio in 1966 for their documentary film Rush to Judgment, Bowers noted that he saw something that attracted his attention, either a flash of light or smoke from the knoll, allowing him to believe "something out of the ordinary" had occurred there. Bowers told Lane that he heard three shots, the last two in quick succession.

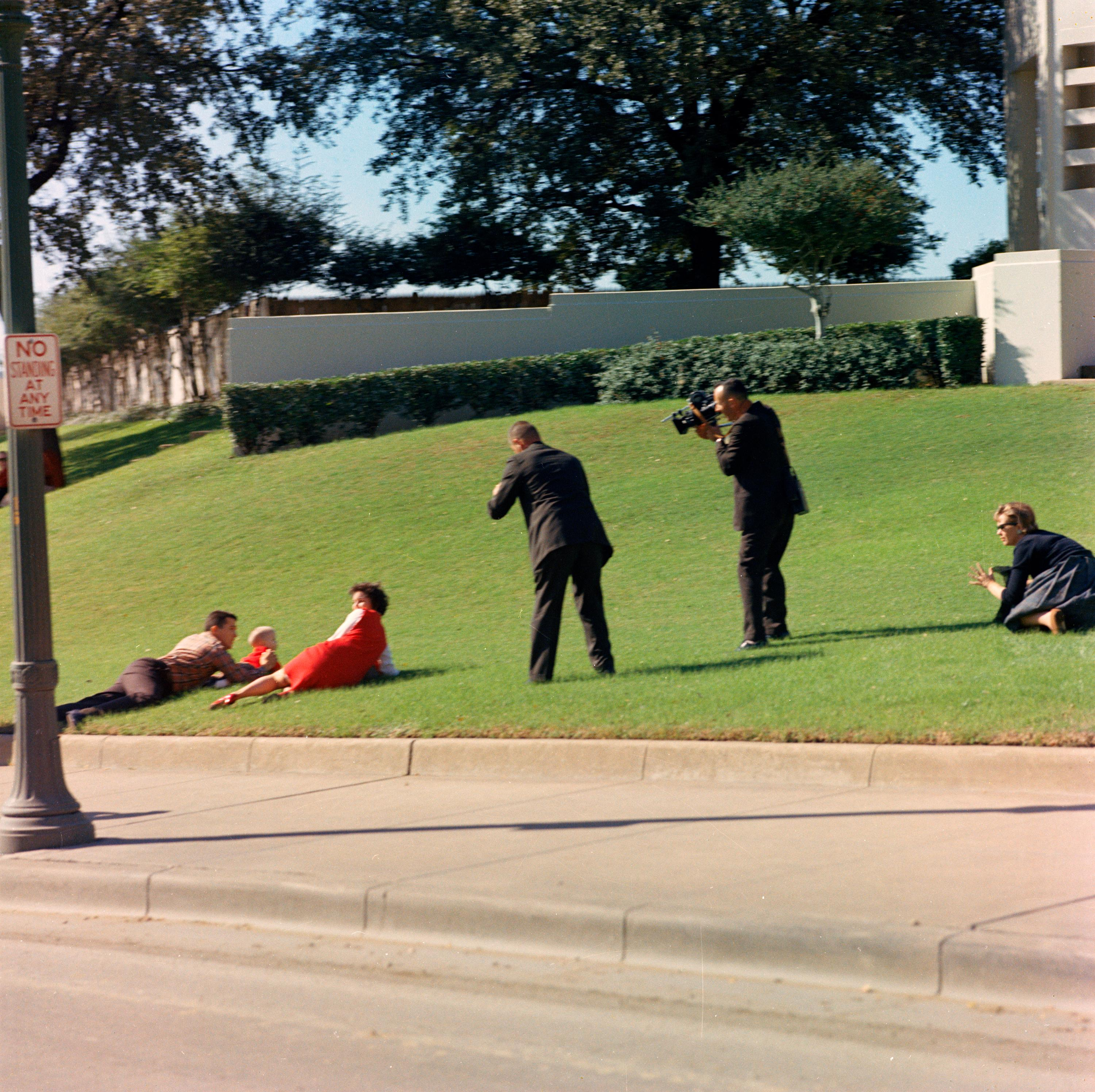
Bill and Jean Newman drop to the grass and cover their children. The Newmans said that they thought the fatal shot came from "the garden" behind them. (Note: In Bill Newman's voluntary statement to the Sheriff's Department, signed and notarized on November 22, 1963, he wrote that the gunshot "had come from the garden directly behind me, that was on an elevation from where I was as I was right on the curb. I do not recall looking toward the Texas School Book Depository. I looked back in the vacinity [sic] of the garden.")

=== Physical evidence ===
Several conspiracy theories posit that at least one shooter was located in the Dal-Tex Building, located across the street from the Texas School Book Depository. According to L. Fletcher Prouty, the physical location of James Tague when he was injured by a bullet fragment is not consistent with the trajectory of a missed shot from the Texas School Book Depository, leading Prouty to theorize that Tague was instead wounded by a missed shot from the second floor of the Dal-Tex Building.

Some researchers claim that FBI photographs of the presidential limousine show a bullet hole in its windshield above the rear-view mirror, and a crack in the windshield itself. When Robert Groden, author of The Killing of a President, asked for an explanation, the FBI responded that what Groden thought was a bullet hole "occurred prior to Dallas".

In 1993, George Whitaker, a manager at the Ford Motor Company's Rouge Plant in Detroit, told attorney and criminal justice professor Doug Weldon that after reporting to work on November 25, 1963, he discovered the presidential limousine in the Rouge Plant's B building with its windshield removed. Whitaker said that the limousine's removed windshield had a through-and-through bullet hole from the front. He said that he was directed by one of Ford's vice presidents to use the windshield as a template to fabricate a new windshield for installation in the limousine. Whitaker also said he was told to destroy the old one.

=== Film and photographic evidence ===
Film and photographic evidence of the assassination have led viewers to different conclusions regarding the origin of the shots. When the fatal shot struck, the President's head and upper torso moved rapidly backwards – indicating, to many observers, a shot from the right front. Sherry Gutierrez, a certified crime scene and bloodstain pattern analyst, concluded "the head injury to President Kennedy was the result of a single gunshot fired from the right front of the President." Paul Chambers believes that the fatal head shot is consistent with a high velocity (approx. 1,200 m/s; 3,900 ft/s) rifle rather than the medium-velocity (600 m/s; 2,000 ft/s) Mannlicher–Carcano.

Close inspection of the Zapruder film (frames 312 and 313) show Kennedy's head moves downward immediately before it moves rapidly backwards. Anthony Marsh suggests that this downward motion was caused by driver William Greer's deceleration of the car. Others, including Josiah Thompson, Robert Groden, and Cyril Wecht, suggest that this downward-and-then-backward motion was caused by two near-simultaneous bullets: one from the rear and the other from the right front.

In 1975, the Rockefeller Commission appointed a panel of experts to review the movement of Kennedy's head and body following the fatal head shot. The panel concluded that "...the violent backward and leftward motion of the President's upper body following the head shot was not caused by the impact of a bullet coming from the front or right front [but was] caused by a violent straightening and stiffening of the entire body as a result of a seizure-like neuromuscular reaction to major damage inflicted to nerve centers in the brain".

=== Acoustical evidence ===
In 1979, the United States House Select Committee on Assassinations (HSCA) agreed with the Warren Commission that Oswald killed Kennedy, but concluded that the commission's report and the original FBI investigation were seriously flawed. The HSCA concluded that at least four shots were fired, with a "high probability" that two gunmen fired at Kennedy, and that a conspiracy was probable. The HSCA stated that the Warren Commission had "failed to investigate adequately the possibility of a conspiracy to assassinate the President".

The acoustical analysis that the HSCA presented as evidence for two gunmen has since been disputed. The HSCA acoustic experts said the Dictabelt evidence came from police officer H. B. McLain's radio microphone stuck in the open position. McLain stated that he was not yet in Dealey Plaza when the assassination occurred. A skeptical McLain asked the Committee, "If it was my radio on my motorcycle, why did it not record the revving up at high speed plus my siren when we immediately took off for Parkland Hospital?"

In 1982, a panel of 12 scientists appointed by the National Academy of Sciences, including Nobel laureates Norman Ramsey and Luis Alvarez, unanimously concluded that the HSCA's acoustic evidence was "seriously flawed". They concluded that the recording was made after the President had already been shot and that the recording did not indicate any additional gunshots. Their conclusions were later published in the journal Science.

In a 2001 article in Science & Justice, a publication of Britain's Forensic Science Society, D. B. Thomas wrote that the NAS investigation was itself flawed. Thomas analyzed audio recordings made during the assassination and concluded with a 96% certainty that a shot was fired from the grassy knoll in front of and to the right of the President's limousine. In 2005, Thomas's conclusions were rebutted in the same journal. Ralph Linsker and several members of the original NAS team reanalyzed the recordings and reaffirmed the earlier conclusion of the NAS report that the alleged shot sounds were recorded approximately one minute after the assassination. In a 2010 book, D. B. Thomas challenged the 2005 Science & Justice article and restated his conclusion that there actually were two gunmen.

=== Medical evidence ===
Some researchers have pointed to the large number of doctors and nurses at Parkland Memorial Hospital who reported that a major part of the back of the President's head was blown out. In 1979, the HSCA noted: "The various accounts of the nature of the wounds to the President ... as described by the staff at Parkland Memorial Hospital, differed from those in the Bethesda autopsy report, as well as from what appears in the autopsy photographs and X-rays". The HSCA concluded that the most probable explanation for the discrepancy between the Parkland doctors' testimony and the Bethesda autopsy witnesses was "that the observations of the Parkland doctors [were] incorrect".

Some critics skeptical of the official "single bullet theory" have stated that the bullet's trajectory, which hit Kennedy above the right shoulder blade and passed through his neck (according to the autopsy), would have had to change course to pass through Connally's rib cage and fracture his wrist. Kennedy's death certificate, which was signed by his personal physician George Burkley, locates the bullet at "about the level of the third thoracic vertebra" – which some claim was not high enough to exit his throat, since the shooter was in a sixth floor window of the Book Depository building, and the bullet traveled downward. The autopsy descriptive sheet displays a diagram of the President's body with the same low placement at the third thoracic vertebra.

There is a conflicting testimony regarding the autopsy performed on Kennedy's body, particularly during the examination on his brain and whether or not the photos submitted as evidence are the same as those taken during the examination. At Bethesda Naval Hospital, Commander J. J. Humes, the chief autopsy pathologist noted that Kennedy's brain weighed 1,500 grams following formalin fixation.

In August 1977, Paul O'Connor, a laboratory technologist who assisted in the President's autopsy, told investigators for the HSCA that there was "nothing left in the cranium but splattered brain matter" and "there was no use me opening the skull because there were no brains." Douglas Horne, the Assassination Record Review Board's chief analyst for military records, said he was "90 to 95% certain" that the photographs in the National Archives are not really of Kennedy's brain. Some conspiracy theorists have said that Kennedy's brain was stolen to cover up evidence that he was shot from the front.

In his book JFK and the Unspeakable, James Douglass cites autopsy doctor Pierre Finck's testimony at the trial of Clay Shaw as evidence that Finck was "... a reluctant witness to the military control over the doctors' examination of the president's body". A bone fragment found in Dealey Plaza by William Harper the day following the assassination was reported by the HSCA's Forensic Pathology Panel to have been from Kennedy's skull, a part of his parietal bone. Some critics of the lone gunman theory, including James Douglass, David Lifton, and David Mantick, contend that the bone fragment that Harper found is not parietal bone, but is actually a piece of Kennedy's occipital bone ejected from an exit wound in the back of his head. They allege this finding is evidence of a cover-up, as it proves that the skull radiographs taken during the autopsy, which do not show significant bone loss in the occipital area, are not authentic.

=== Oswald's marksmanship ===
The Warren Commission examined the capabilities of the Carcano rifle and ammunition, as well as Oswald's military training and post-military experience, and determined that Oswald had the ability to fire three shots within a time span of 4.8 to 5.6 seconds. According to their report, an army specialist using Oswald's rifle was able to duplicate the feat and even improved on the time. The report also states that the Army Infantry Weapons Evaluation Branch test fired Oswald's rifle 47 times and found that it was "quite accurate", comparing it to the accuracy of an M14 rifle. Also contained in the Commission report is testimony by Marine Corps Major Eugene Anderson confirming that Oswald's military records show that he qualified as "sharpshooter" in 1956.

According to official Marine Corps records, Oswald was tested in shooting in December 1956, scoring 212, slightly above the minimum for qualification as a sharpshooter – the intermediate category. In May 1959, he scored 191, earning the lower designation of marksman. The highest marksmanship category in the Marine Corps is 'Expert' (220). Despite Oswald's confirmed marksmanship in the USMC, conspiracy theorists like Walt Brown and authors such as Richard H. Popkin contend that Oswald was a notoriously poor shot, that his rifle was inaccurate, and that no reconstruction of the event has ever been able to duplicate his ability to fire three shots within the time frame given by the Warren Commission.

=== Role of Oswald ===
The Warren Commission concluded that "there is no evidence that [Oswald] was involved in any conspiracy directed to the assassination of the President." The Commission came to this conclusion after examining Oswald's Marxist and pro-Communist background, including his defection to Russia, the New Orleans branch of the Fair Play for Cuba Committee he had organized, and the various public and private statements made by him espousing Marxism. Some conspiracy theorists have argued that Oswald's pro-Communist behavior was in fact a carefully planned ruse and part of an effort by U.S. intelligence agencies to infiltrate left-wing groups and conduct counterintelligence operations in communist countries. Others speculate that Oswald was either an agent or an informant of the U.S. government and that he may have been trying to expose the plot behind the assassination.

Oswald denied shooting anyone and declared that he was "just a patsy". Dallas Police Department Chief Jesse Curry said, "I'm not sure about it. No one has ever been able to put [Oswald] in the Texas School Book Depository with a rifle in his hand." When asked to account for himself at the time of the assassination, Oswald claimed that he "went outside to watch P. Parade", referring to the presidential motorcade, and was "out with [William Shelley, a foreman at the depository] in front", and that he was at the "front entrance to the first floor". Initially, Texas School Book Depository superintendent Roy Truly and Occhus Campbell, the Depository vice president, said they saw Oswald in the first floor storage room after the shooting. Some researchers theorize that a man who was filmed by Dave Wiegman Jr. of NBC, and James Darnell of WBAP-TV, standing on the Depository front steps during the assassination, referred to as "prayer man", is Oswald.

Oswald's role as FBI informant was investigated by Lee Rankin and others of the Warren Commission, but their findings were inconclusive. Several FBI employees had made statements indicating that Oswald was indeed a paid informant, but the Commission was nonetheless unable to verify the veracity of those claims. FBI agent James Hosty reported that his office's interactions with Oswald were limited to dealing with his complaints about being harassed by the Bureau for being a communist sympathizer. In the weeks before the assassination, Oswald made a personal visit to the FBI's Dallas branch office with a hand-delivered letter, which purportedly contained a threat of some sort but, controversially, Hosty destroyed the letter by order of J. Gordon Shanklin, his supervisor.

Some researchers suggest that Oswald served as an active agent of the Central Intelligence Agency, often pointing to how he attempted to defect to Russia but was able to return without difficulty, even receiving a repatriation loan from the State Department, as evidence of such. A former roommate of Oswald, James Botelho, who later became a California judge, stated in an interview with Mark Lane that he believed Oswald was involved in an intelligence assignment in Russia, although Botelho did not mention this suspicion in his testimony to the Warren Commission years earlier. Oswald's mother Marguerite often insisted that her son was recruited by an agency of the U.S. Government and sent to Russia.

New Orleans District Attorney, and later judge, Jim Garrison, who in 1967 brought Clay Shaw to trial for the assassination of President Kennedy, held the opinion that Oswald was most likely a CIA agent drawn into the plot to be used as a scapegoat, even going as far as to say that Oswald "genuinely was probably a hero". Senator Richard Schweiker, a member of the U.S. Senate Select Committee on Intelligence, remarked that "everywhere you look with [Oswald], there're fingerprints of intelligence". Schweiker told author David Talbot that Oswald "was the product of a fake defector program run by the CIA." Richard Sprague, interim staff director and chief counsel to the U.S. House Select Committee on Assassinations, stated that if he "had to do it over again", he would have investigated the Kennedy assassination by probing Oswald's ties to the Central Intelligence Agency.

In 1978, James Wilcott, a former CIA finance officer, testified before the HSCA (Note: see "Testimony of James B. Wilcott, a former employee of the Central Intelligence Agency" (PDF). HSCA hearings. March 22, 1978.) that shortly after the assassination of President Kennedy he was advised by fellow employees at a CIA post abroad that Oswald was a CIA agent who had received financial disbursements under an assigned cryptonym. Wilcott was unable to identify the specific case officer who had initially informed him of Oswald's agency relationship, nor was he able to recall the name of the cryptonym, but he named several employees of the post abroad with whom he believed he had subsequently discussed the allegations. Later that year Wilcott and his wife, Elsie, also a former employee of the CIA, repeated those claims in an article in the San Francisco Chronicle. The HSCA investigated Wilcott's claims – an investigation that included interviews with the chief of station and officers in counterintelligence – and concluded that Wilcott's claims were "not worthy of belief".

Despite its official policy of neither confirming nor denying the status of agents, both the CIA itself and many officers working in the region at the time (including David Atlee Phillips) have "unofficially" dismissed the plausibility of any possible ties of Oswald to the agency. Robert Blakey, staff director and chief counsel for the U.S. House Select Committee on Assassinations, supported that assessment in his conclusions as well.

=== Alternative gunmen ===
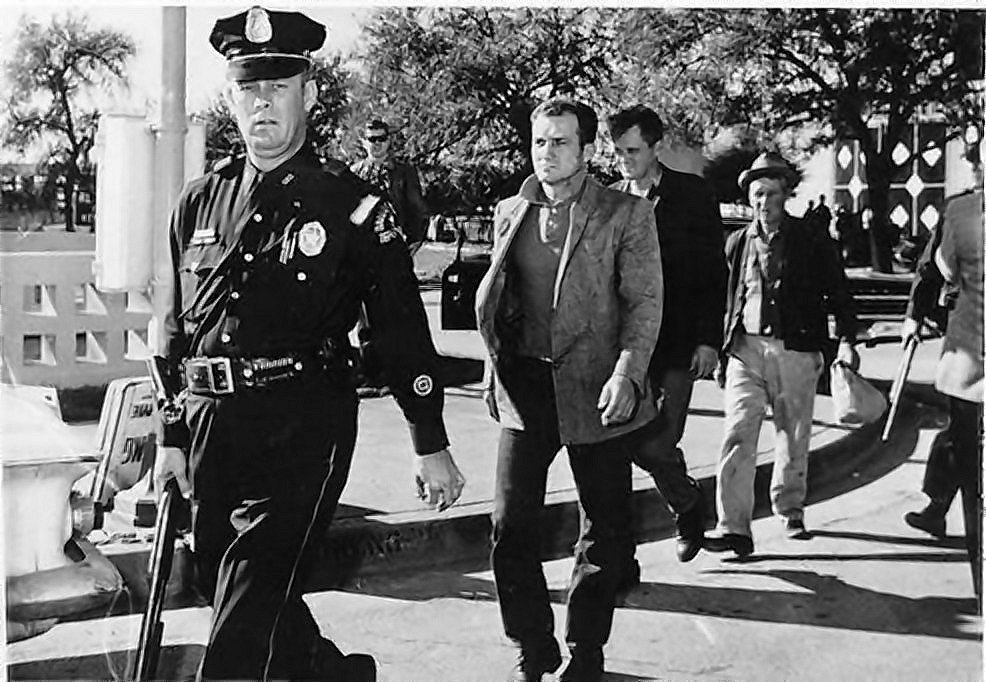
The three tramps

In addition to Oswald, Jerome Kroth has named 26 people as "Possible Assassins In Dealey Plaza". They include: Orlando Bosch, James Files, Desmond Fitzgerald, Charles Harrelson, Gerry Hemming, Chauncey Holt, Howard Hunt, Charles Nicoletti, Charles Rogers, Johnny Roselli, Lucien Sarti, and Frank Sturgis.

=== Three tramps ===
Vincent Bugliosi provides a "partial list of assassins ... whom one or more conspiracy theorists have actually named and identified as having fired a weapon at Kennedy" in his book Reclaiming History. He mentions the three tramps, men photographed by several Dallas-area newspapers under police escort near the Texas School Book Depository shortly after the assassination. Since the mid-1960s, various allegations have been made about the identities of the men and their involvement in a conspiracy to kill Kennedy. Records released by the Dallas Police Department in 1989 identified the men as Gus Abrams, Harold Doyle, and John Gedney.

== Allegations of other conspirators ==
=== E. Howard Hunt ===
The theory that the former CIA agent and Watergate burglar E. Howard Hunt was a participant in the assassination of Kennedy garnered much publicity from 1978 to 2000. In 1981, Hunt won a libel judgment against Liberty Lobby's paper The Spotlight, which in 1978 printed an allegation by Victor Marchetti stating that Hunt was in Dallas on the day of the assassination and suggesting Hunt's involvement in a conspiracy; the libel award was thrown out on appeal and the newspaper was successfully defended by Mark Lane in a second trial.

After Hunt's death in 2007, an audio-taped "deathbed confession" in which Hunt claimed first-hand knowledge of a conspiracy, as a co-conspirator, was released by his son Saint John Hunt. In the confession, Hunt claimed to have been a "bench warmer" in Dallas during the events, and he named several high-level CIA operatives as those who likely carried out the logistics of the assassination. Hunt named Vice President Lyndon Johnson as the most likely figure behind the main impetus of the conspiracy. The authenticity of the confession was met with some skepticism.

=== J. D. Tippit ===
Dallas Police Officer J. D. Tippit has been named in some conspiracy theories as a renegade CIA operative sent to silence Oswald and as the "badge man" assassin on the grassy knoll. According to some Warren Commission critics, Oswald was set up to be killed by Tippit, and Tippit was killed by Oswald in self-defense. Other critics doubt that Tippit was killed by Oswald and assert he was shot by other conspirators. Some critics have alleged that Tippit was associated with organized crime or right-wing politics.

=== Bernard Weissman ===
Advertisement in the November 22, 1963, Dallas Morning News, placed by Bernard Weissman and three others

According to the Warren Commission, the publication of a full-page, paid advertisement critical of Kennedy in the November 22, 1963, Dallas Morning News, which was signed by "The American Fact-Finding Committee" and noted Bernard Weissman as its chairman, was investigated to determine whether any members of the group claiming responsibility for it were connected to Oswald or to the assassination. The Commission stated that "The American Fact-Finding Committee" was a fictitious sponsoring organization and that there was no evidence linking the four men responsible for the genesis of the ad with either Oswald or Ruby, or to a conspiracy to assassinate Kennedy.

Related to the advertisement, Mark Lane testified during the Warren Commission's hearings that an informant whom he refused to name told him that Weismann had met with Tippit and Ruby eight days before the assassination at Ruby's Carousel Club. The Commission reported that they "found no evidence that such a meeting took place anywhere at any time" and that there was no "credible evidence that any of the three men knew each other".

Lane later stated that he initially learned of the meeting through reporter Thayer Waldo of the Fort Worth Star-Telegram. According to Lane, a "prominent Dallas figure" who frequented Ruby's Carousel Club told Waldo, and later Lane, that he observed the meeting of the three men at the club. He said, "I had promised the man he would not be involved; he was a leading Dallas citizen; he was married, and the stripper he was going with had become pregnant." Despite not having revealed to the Warren Commission that Waldo was his original source of the alleged meeting, Lane disputed their findings and complained that they failed to ask Waldo about it. According to Hugh Aynesworth, the source of the allegation whose identity Lane promised not to reveal was Carroll Jarnagin, a Dallas attorney who had also claimed to have overheard a meeting between Oswald and Ruby. Aynesworth wrote: "Several people in Dallas were well aware of Jarnagin's tale, and that he later admitted making it all up."

=== Fred Crisman ===
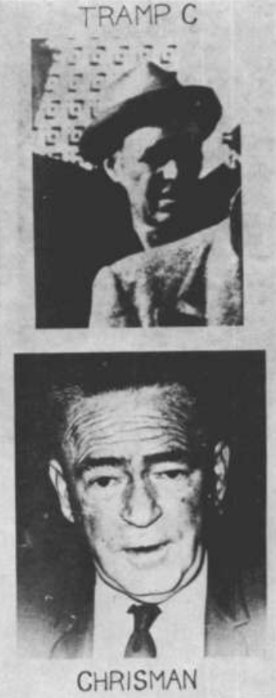
In an exhibit of the Committee on Assassinations, one of the three tramps photographed near Dealey Plaza on the day of the John F. Kennedy assassination is compared to Fred Crisman (bottom)

Fred Crisman (1919–1975) was a World War II fighter pilot who was subpoenaed to testify before a New Orleans grand jury in the 1968 prosecution of Clay Shaw by district attorney Jim Garrison. Garrison claimed that Shaw's first call after his arrest was to Crisman and Garrison's office publicly accused Crisman of being "engaged in undercover activity for a part of the industrial warfare complex". By January 9, 1969, Kennedy assassination conspiracy theorist Richard E. Sprague was privately accusing Crisman of being one of the three tramps. In 1979, the House Select Committee on Assassinations reported that forensic anthropologists had again analyzed and compared the photographs of the "tramps" with those of Hunt and Sturgis, as well as with photographs of Thomas Vallee, Daniel Carswell, and Fred Lee Crisman. According to the Committee, only Crisman resembled any of the tramps; but the same Committee determined that he was not in Dealey Plaza on the day of the assassination.

=== Unnamed accomplice(s) in the murder of J. D. Tippit ===
The Warren Commission concluded that Oswald killed President Kennedy and then "killed Dallas Police Officer J. D. Tippit in an apparent attempt to escape." Regarding the evidence against Oswald in the shooting of Tippit, the Commission cited: "(1) two eyewitnesses who heard the shots and saw the shooting of Dallas Police Patrolman J. D. Tippit and seven eyewitnesses who saw the flight of the gunman with revolver in hand positively identified Lee Harvey Oswald as the man they saw fire the shots or flee from the scene, (2) the cartridge cases found near the scene of the shooting were fired from the revolver in the possession of Oswald at the time of his arrest, to the exclusion of all other weapons, (3) the revolver in Oswald's possession at the time of his arrest was purchased by and belonged to Oswald, and (4) Oswald's jacket was found along the path of flight taken by the gunman as he fled from the scene of the killing."

Some researchers have alleged that the murder of Officer Tippit was part of a conspiracy to kill President Kennedy. Jim Marrs hypothesized that "the slaying of Officer J. D. Tippit may have played some part in [a] scheme to have Oswald killed, perhaps to eliminate co-conspirator Tippit or simply to anger Dallas police and cause itchy trigger fingers." Researcher James Douglass said that "... the killing of [Tippit] helped motivate the Dallas police to kill an armed Oswald in the Texas Theater [where Oswald was arrested], which would have disposed of the scapegoat before he could protest his being framed." Harold Weisberg offered a simpler explanation: "Immediately, the [flimsy] police case [against Oswald] required a willingness to believe. This was proved by affixing to Oswald the opprobrious epithet of 'cop-killer.'" Jim Garrison alleged that evidence was altered to frame Oswald, stating: "If Oswald was innocent of the Tippit murder the foundation of the government's case against him collapsed."

Some critics doubt that Tippit was killed by Oswald and assert he was shot by other conspirators. They allege discrepancies in witness testimony and physical evidence that they think call into question the Commission's conclusions regarding the murder of Tippit. According to Jim Marrs, Oswald's guilt in the assassination of Kennedy is placed in question by the presence of "a growing body of evidence to suggest that [he] did not kill Tippit". Others say that multiple men were directly involved in Tippit's killing. Conspiracy researcher Kenn Thomas has alleged that the Warren Commission omitted testimony and evidence that two men shot Tippit and that one left the scene in a car.

William Alexander – the Dallas assistant district attorney who recommended that Oswald be charged with the Kennedy and Tippit murders – later became skeptical of the Warren Commission's version of the Tippit murder. He stated that the Commission's conclusions on Oswald's movements "don't add up", and that "certainly [Oswald] may have had accomplices." According to Brian McKenna's review of Henry Hurt's book, Reasonable Doubt, Hurt reported that "Tippit may have been killed because he impregnated the wife of another man" and that Dallas police officers lied and altered evidence to set up Oswald to save Tippit's reputation. In the documentary JFK to 9/11, Francis Conolly claims that Tippit was shot because his looks resembled Kennedy's. Conolly speculates that the assassination plot did not go as planned, and that the conspirators needed a second body. He further theorizes that Tippit's body and JFK's body were switched on Air Force Two.

==== Allegations about witness testimony and physical evidence ====
The Warren Commission identified Helen Markham and Domingo Benavides as two witnesses who actually saw the shooting of Officer Tippit. Conspiracy theorist Richard Belzer criticized the Commission for, in his description, "relying" on the testimony of Markham whom he described as "imaginative". Jim Marrs also took issue with Markham's testimony, stating that her "credibility ... was strained to the breaking point". Joseph Ball, senior counsel to the Commission, referred to Markham's testimony as "full of mistakes", characterizing her as an "utter screwball". The Warren Commission addressed concerns regarding Markham's reliability as a witness and concluded: "However, even in the absence of Mrs. Markham's testimony, there is ample evidence to identify Oswald as the killer of Tippit."

Domingo Benavides initially said that he did not think he could identify Tippit's assailant and was never asked to view a police lineup, even though he was the person closest to the killing. Benavides later testified that the killer resembled pictures he had seen of Oswald. Other witnesses were taken to police lineups. However, critics have questioned these lineups as they consisted of people who looked very different from Oswald. Witnesses who did not appear before the Commission identified an assailant who was not Oswald. Acquilla Clemons said she saw two men near Tippit's car just before the shooting. She said that after the shooting, she ran outside of her house and saw a man with a gun whom she described as "kind of heavy". She said he waved to the second man, urging him to "go on". Frank Wright said he emerged from his home and observed the scene seconds after the shooting. He described a man standing by Tippit's body who had on a long coat and said the man ran to a parked car and drove away.

Critics have questioned whether the cartridge cases recovered from the scene were the same as those that were subsequently entered into evidence. Two of the cases were recovered by witness Domingo Benavides and turned over to police officer J. M. Poe. Poe told the FBI that he marked the shells with his own initials, "J.M.P." to identify them. Sergeant Gerald Hill later testified to the Warren Commission that it was he who had ordered police officer Poe to mark the shells. However, Poe's initials were not found on the shells produced by the FBI six months later. Testifying before the Warren Commission, Poe said that although he recalled marking the cases, he "couldn't swear to it". The identification of the cases at the crime scene raises more questions. Sergeant Gerald Hill examined one of the shells and radioed the police dispatcher, saying: "The shell at the scene indicates that the suspect is armed with an automatic .38 rather than a pistol." However, Oswald was reportedly arrested carrying a non-automatic .38 Special revolver.

==== Allegations about timeline ====
The Warren Commission investigated Oswald's movements between the time of the assassination and the shooting of Tippit, to ascertain whether Oswald might have had an accomplice who helped him flee the Book Depository. The Commission concluded "... through the testimony of seven witnesses [that] Oswald was always alone." According to their final report, Oswald was seen by his housekeeper, Earlene Roberts, leaving his rooming house shortly after 1:00 pm and had enough time to travel nine-tenths of a mile (1.4 km) to the scene where Tippit was killed at 1:16 pm. (Note: According to the Warren Commission, after Earlene Roberts saw Oswald standing near the bus stop outside his rooming house, "[he] was next seen about nine-tenths of a mile (1.4 km) away at the southeast corner of 10th Street and Patton Avenue, moments before the Tippit shooting.")

Witness Helen Markham stated in her affidavit to the Dallas Sheriff's department that Tippit was killed at "approximately 1:06 pm." She later affirmed the time in testimony before the Warren Commission, saying: "I wouldn't be afraid to bet it wasn't 6 or 7 minutes after 1." She initially told the FBI that the shooting occurred "possibly around 1:30 pm." In an unpublished manuscript titled When They Kill a President, Deputy Sheriff Roger Craig stated that when he heard the news that Tippit had been shot, he noted that the time was 1:06 pm. However, in a later statement to the press, Craig seemed confused about the time of the shooting.

Warren Burroughs, who ran the concession stand at the Texas Theater where Oswald was arrested, said that Oswald came into the theater between 1:00 and 1:07 pm; he also claimed he sold Oswald popcorn at 1:15 pm – the "official" time of Officer Tippit's murder. A theater patron, Jack Davis, also corroborated Burroughs's time, claiming he observed Oswald in the theater prior to 1:20 pm.

== Unidentified witnesses ==
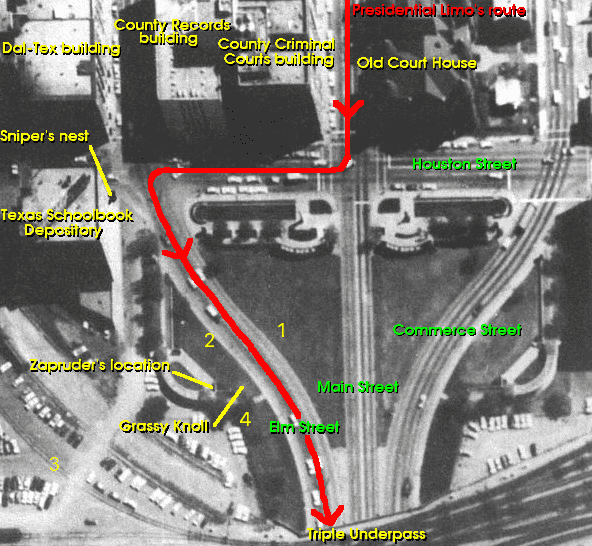
1. Babushka lady, 2. Umbrella man (Louie Witt) 3. Three tramps, 4. Badge man. Photo of Dealey Plaza (annotated), from Warren Commission report. North to the almost direct left.

=== Babushka Lady ===
The Babushka Lady was a woman who was seen to be holding a camera by eyewitnesses and was also seen in film accounts of the assassination. Her nickname arose from the headscarf she wore, which was similar to scarves worn by elderly Russian women. She was observed standing on the grass between Elm and Main streets, standing amongst onlookers in front of the Dallas County Building, and is visible in the Zapruder film as well as in the films of Orville Nix, Marie Muchmore, and Mark Bell. She is last seen in photographs walking east on Elm Street. Neither she, nor the film she may have taken, have ever been positively identified.

=== Umbrella man ===
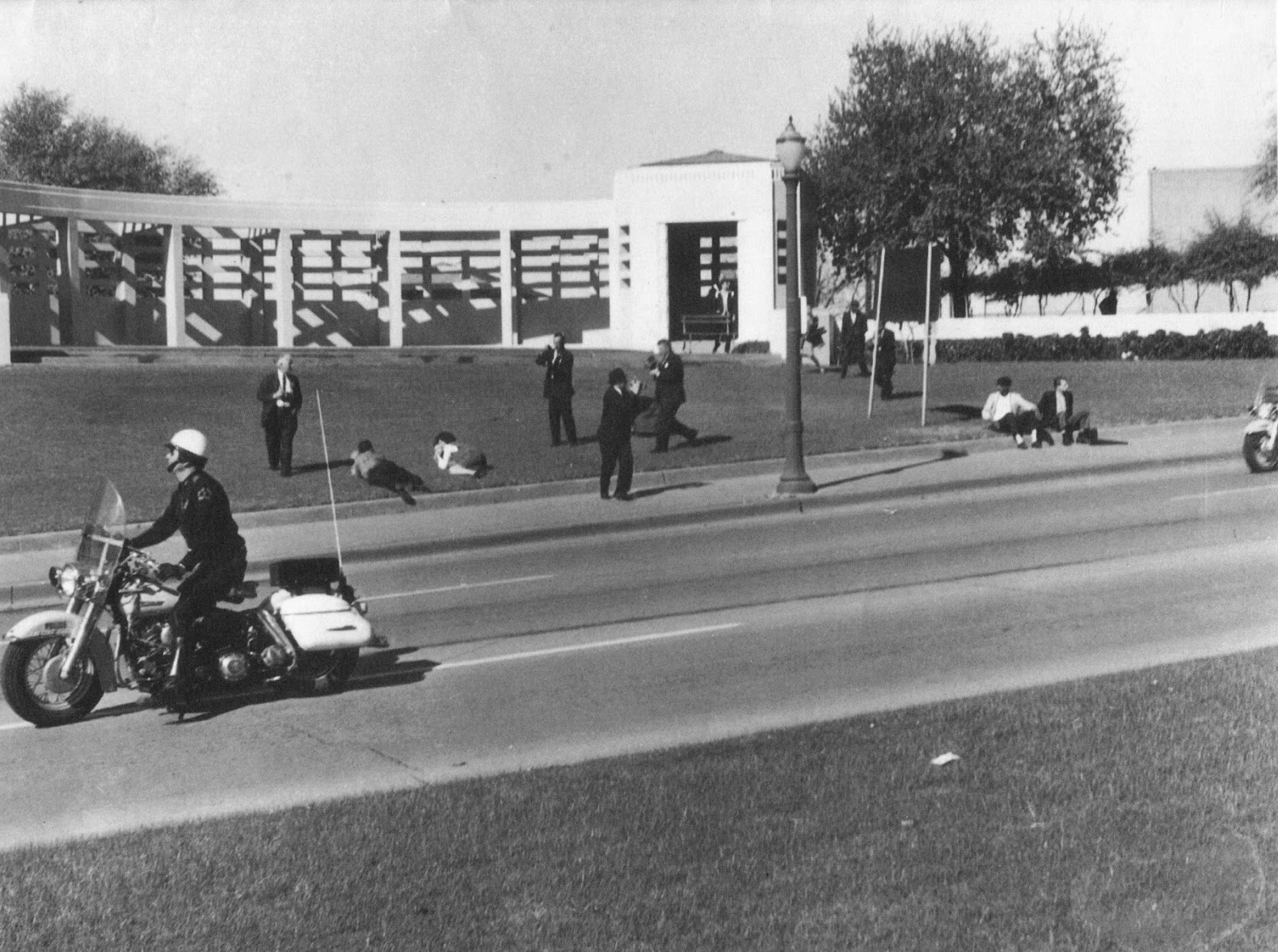
Following the assassination of President Kennedy, the "umbrella man" can be seen sitting on the sidewalk next to the "dark complected man" on the right side of the photograph.

The so-called "umbrella man" was one of the closest bystanders to the president when he was first struck by a bullet. The "umbrella man" has become the subject of conspiracy theories after footage of the assassination showed him holding an open umbrella as the Kennedy motorcade passed, despite the fact that it was not raining at the time. One conspiracy theory, proposed by assassination researcher Robert Cutler, suggests that a dart with a paralyzing agent could have been fired from the umbrella, disabling Kennedy and making him a "sitting duck" for an assassination. In 1975, CIA weapons developer Charles Senseney told the Senate Intelligence Committee that such an umbrella weapon was in the hands of the CIA in 1963. A more prevalent conspiracy theory holds that the umbrella could have been used to provide visual signals to hidden gunmen.

In 1978, Louie Steven Witt came forward and identified himself as the "umbrella man". Testifying before the United States House Select Committee on Assassinations, Witt stated he brought the umbrella to heckle Kennedy and protest the appeasement policies of the president's father, Joseph Kennedy. He added: "I think if the Guinness Book of World Records had a category for people who were at the wrong place at the wrong time, doing the wrong thing, I would be No. 1 in that position, without even a close runner-up." Some researchers have noted a number of inconsistencies with Witt's story, however, and doubt him to be the "umbrella man".

=== Dark complected man ===
An unidentified individual who is referred to by some conspiracy theorists as the "dark complected man" can be seen in several photographs, taken seconds after the assassination, sitting on the sidewalk next to the "umbrella man" on the north side of Elm Street. Louie Steven Witt, who identified himself as the "umbrella man", said he was unable to identify the other individual, whose dark complexion has led some conspiracy theorists to speculate Cuban government involvement, or Cuban exile involvement, in the assassination of Kennedy.

=== Badge Man ===
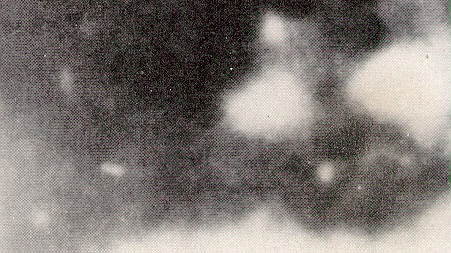
Some conspiracy theorists believe that "Badge Man" could have fired the fatal shot that killed President Kennedy.

"Badge Man" and "tin hat man" are figures on the grassy knoll who it is alleged can be seen in the Mary Moorman photo, taken approximately one-sixth of a second after President Kennedy was struck with the fatal head wound. The figures were first discovered by researchers Jack White and Gary Mack and are discussed in a 1988 documentary The Men Who Killed Kennedy, where it is alleged a third figure can also be seen on the grassy knoll, possibly the eyewitness Gordon Arnold. The "badge man" figure – so called as he appears to be wearing a uniform similar to that worn by a policeman, with a badge prominent – helped fuel conspiracy theories linking Dallas Police officers, or someone impersonating a police officer, to the assassination.

=== Black dog man ===
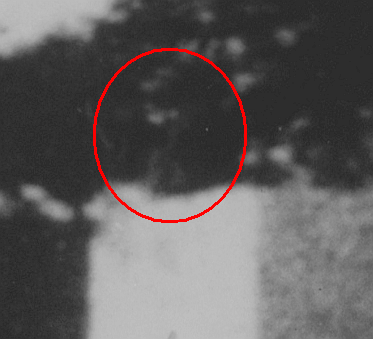
"Black Dog Man"

Another "figure" is the so-called "black dog man" figure who can be seen at the corner of a retaining wall in the Willis and Betzner photo of the assassination. In an interview, Marilyn Sitzman told Josiah Thompson that she saw a young black couple who were eating lunch and drinking Cokes on a bench behind the retaining wall and, therefore, it is possible that the "black dog man" figure is actually one of the pair.

In The Killing of a President, Robert Groden argues that the "black dog man" figure can be seen in a pyracantha bush in frame 413 of the Zapruder film. The United States House Select Committee on Assassinations concluded that a head of an individual could be seen but that this individual was situated in front of, rather than behind the bushes. Bill Miller argues that this individual is actually the eyewitness Emmett Hudson.

== Conspiracy theories ==
Conspiracy theorists consider four or five groups, alone or in combination, to be the primary suspects in the assassination of Kennedy: the CIA, the military-industrial complex, organized crime, the government of Cuba led by Fidel Castro, and Cuban exiles. Other domestic individuals, groups, or organizations implicated in various conspiracy theories include Lyndon Johnson, George H. W. Bush, Sam Giancana, Carlos Marcello, J. Edgar Hoover, Earl Warren, the Federal Bureau of Investigation, the United States Secret Service, the John Birch Society, and far-right wealthy Texans. Some other alleged foreign conspirators include the KGB and Nikita Khrushchev, Aristotle Onassis, the government of South Vietnam, the Israeli government and international drug lords, including a French heroin syndicate.

=== New Orleans conspiracy ===
New Orleans District Attorney Jim Garrison began an investigation into the Kennedy assassination in 1966. Garrison developed a theory of a plot that included a group of New Orleans residents in his jurisdiction. Garrison's 1988 book On the Trail of the Assassins discusses his prosecution of Clay Shaw for the assassination, and was partially adapted by Oliver Stone for his 1991 film JFK. The final report of the Assassination Records Review Board (ARRB) stated that the film "popularized a version of President Kennedy's assassination that featured U.S. government agents from the Federal Bureau of Investigation (FBI), the Central Intelligence Agency (CIA), and the military as conspirators." Journalist Rosemary James, whose article with Jack Dempsey and David Snyder in the New Orleans States-Item broke the news of the Garrison investigation, stated that because Garrison's theory evolved frequently, it was mockingly called the "theory du jour" by the media.

Pamela Colloff and Michael Hall described the theory held by Garrison and Stone for Texas Monthly this way: "There is a secret government within our government, a cabal that in 1963 ordered the murder of a popular president, set up a patsy, installed its own puppet, and orchestrated an elaborate cover-up that included tampering with the corpse, destroying and suppressing evidence, and killing witnesses. Heading the cabal were some of the world's most powerful men: rich and corrupt industrialists, generals, and right-wing politicians. Down below was an eclectic group of mobsters, spooks, lowlifes, and anti-Castro extremists, many of whom were headquartered at 544 Camp Street in New Orleans, including Oswald, former FBI agent Guy Banister, soldier of fortune David Ferrie, and suspected CIA informant Clay Shaw. Together, in the summer of 1963, they plotted Kennedy's demise."

Soon after the assassination of President Kennedy, Oswald's activities in New Orleans, Louisiana, during the spring and summer of 1963, came under scrutiny. Three days after the assassination, on November 25, 1963, New Orleans attorney Dean Andrews told the FBI that he received a telephone call from a man named Clay Bertrand, on the day of the assassination, asking him to defend Oswald. Andrews would later repeat this claim in testimony to the Warren Commission.

David Ferrie (second from left) with Lee Harvey Oswald (far right) in the New Orleans Civil Air Patrol in 1955

Also, in late November 1963, an employee of the New Orleans private investigator Guy Banister named Jack Martin began making accusations that fellow Banister employee David Ferrie was involved in the JFK assassination. Martin told police that Ferrie "was supposed to have been the getaway pilot in the assassination." He said that Ferrie had outlined plans to kill Kennedy and that Ferrie might have taught Oswald how to use a rifle with a telescopic sight. Martin claimed that Ferrie had known Oswald from their days in the New Orleans Civil Air Patrol, and that he had seen a photograph, at Ferrie's home, of Oswald in a Civil Air Patrol group. Ferrie denied any association with Oswald.

It was later discovered that Ferrie had attended Civil Air Patrol meetings in New Orleans in the 1950s that were attended by a teenage Lee Harvey Oswald. In 1993, the PBS television program Frontline obtained a photograph taken in 1955, eight years before the assassination, showing Oswald and Ferrie at a Civil Air Patrol cookout with other C.A.P. cadets. Whether Oswald's and Ferrie's association in the Civil Air Patrol in 1955 is relevant to their later possible association in 1963 is a subject of debate.

According to several witnesses, in 1963, both Ferrie and Banister were working for lawyer G. Wray Gill on behalf of Gill's client, New Orleans Mafia boss Carlos Marcello, in an attempt to block Marcello's deportation to Guatemala. On the afternoon of November 22, 1963 – the day John F. Kennedy was assassinated and the day Marcello was acquitted in his deportation case – the New Orleans private investigator Guy Banister and his employee Jack Martin were drinking together at a local bar. On their return to Banister's office, the two men got into a heated argument. According to Martin, Banister said something to which Martin replied, "What are you going to do – kill me like you all did Kennedy?". Banister drew his .357 magnum revolver and pistol-whipped Martin several times. Martin, badly injured, went by ambulance to Charity Hospital.

Earlier, in the spring of 1963, Oswald had written to the New York City headquarters of the pro-Castro Fair Play for Cuba Committee, proposing to rent "a small office at my own expense for the purpose of forming a FPCC branch here in New Orleans". As the sole member of the New Orleans chapter of the Fair Play for Cuba Committee, Oswald ordered 1,000 leaflets with the heading, "Hands Off Cuba" from a local printer. On August 16, 1963, Oswald passed out Fair Play for Cuba leaflets in front of the International Trade Mart in New Orleans.

One of Oswald's leaflets had the address "544 Camp Street" hand-stamped on it, apparently by Oswald himself. The address was in the "Newman Building", which from October 1961 to February 1962 housed the Cuban Revolutionary Council, a militant anti-Castro group. Around the corner but located in the same building, with a different entrance, was the address 531 Lafayette Street – the address of "Guy Banister Associates", the private detective agency run by Guy Banister. Banister's office was involved in anti-Castro and private investigative activities in the New Orleans area. A CIA file indicated that in September 1960, the CIA had considered "using Guy Banister Associates for the collection of foreign intelligence, but ultimately decided against it".

In the late 1970s, the House Select Committee on Assassinations (HSCA) investigated the possible relationship of Oswald to Banister's office. While the committee was unable to interview Guy Banister, who died in 1964, the committee interviewed his brother Ross Banister. Ross "told the committee that his brother had mentioned seeing Oswald hand out Fair Play for Cuba literature on one occasion. Ross theorized that Oswald had used the 544 Camp Street address on his literature to embarrass Guy."

Guy Banister's secretary, Delphine Roberts, would later tell author Anthony Summers that she saw Oswald at Banister's office, and that he filled out one of Banister's "agent" application forms. She said, "Oswald came back a number of times. He seemed to be on familiar terms with Banister and with the office." The House Select Committee on Assassinations investigated Roberts's claims and said that "because of contradictions in Roberts' statements to the committee and lack of independent corroboration of many of her statements, the reliability of her statements could not be determined."

In 1966, New Orleans District Attorney Jim Garrison began an investigation into the assassination of President Kennedy. Garrison's investigation led him to conclude that a group of right-wing extremists, including David Ferrie and Guy Banister, were involved with elements of the Central Intelligence Agency (CIA) in a conspiracy to kill Kennedy. Garrison later claimed that the motive for the assassination was anger over Kennedy's attempts to obtain a peace settlement in both Cuba and Vietnam. Garrison came to believe that New Orleans businessman Clay Shaw was part of the conspiracy and that Clay Shaw used the pseudonym "Clay Bertrand". Garrison further believed that Shaw, Banister, and Ferrie conspired to set up Oswald as a patsy in the JFK assassination. On March 1, 1967, Garrison arrested and charged Shaw with conspiring to assassinate President Kennedy. On January 29, 1969, Clay Shaw was brought to trial on these charges, and the jury found him not guilty.

=== CIA conspiracy ===
Addressing speculation that Oswald was a CIA agent or had some relationship with the Agency, the Warren Commission stated in 1964 that their investigation "revealed no evidence that Oswald was ever employed [by the] CIA in any capacity." The House Select Committee on Assassinations reported similarly in 1979 that "there was no indication in Oswald's CIA file that he had ever had contact with the Agency" and concluded that the CIA was not involved in the assassination of Kennedy. Gaeton Fonzi, an investigator for the House Select Committee on Assassinations, wrote that investigators were pressured not to look into the relationship between Lee Harvey Oswald and the CIA. He stated that CIA agent David Atlee Phillips, using the pseudonym "Maurice Bishop", was involved with Oswald prior to the Kennedy assassination in connection with anti-Castro Cuban groups.

In 1995, former U.S. Army Intelligence officer and National Security Agency executive assistant John M. Newman published evidence that both the CIA and FBI deliberately tampered with their files on Lee Harvey Oswald both before and after the assassination. He found that both agencies withheld information that might have alerted authorities in Dallas that Oswald posed a potential threat to the President. Subsequently, Newman expressed the belief that CIA chief of counter-intelligence James Angleton was probably the key figure in the assassination. According to Newman, only Angleton "had the access, the authority, and the diabolically ingenious mind to manage this sophisticated plot." Newman surmised that the cover operation was not under James Angleton, but under Allen Dulles, the former CIA director, and a later Warren Commission member, who had been dismissed by Kennedy after the failed Bay of Pigs invasion.

In 1977, the FBI released 40,000 files pertaining to the assassination of Kennedy, including an April 3, 1967, memorandum from Deputy Director Cartha DeLoach to Associate Director Clyde Tolson that was written less than a month after President Johnson learned from J. Edgar Hoover about CIA plots to kill Fidel Castro. The memorandum reads: "Marvin Watson [adviser to President Johnson] called me late last night and stated that the president had told him, in an off moment, that he was now convinced that there was a plot in connection with the [JFK] assassination. Watson stated the president felt that [the] CIA had had something to do with plot." Later, Cartha DeLoach testified to the Church Committee that he "felt this to be sheer speculation".

=== Shadow government conspiracy ===
One conspiracy theory suggests that a secret or shadow government including wealthy industrialists and right-wing politicians ordered the assassination of Kennedy. Peter Dale Scott has indicated that Kennedy's death allowed for policy reversals desired by the secret government to escalate the United States' military involvement in Vietnam.

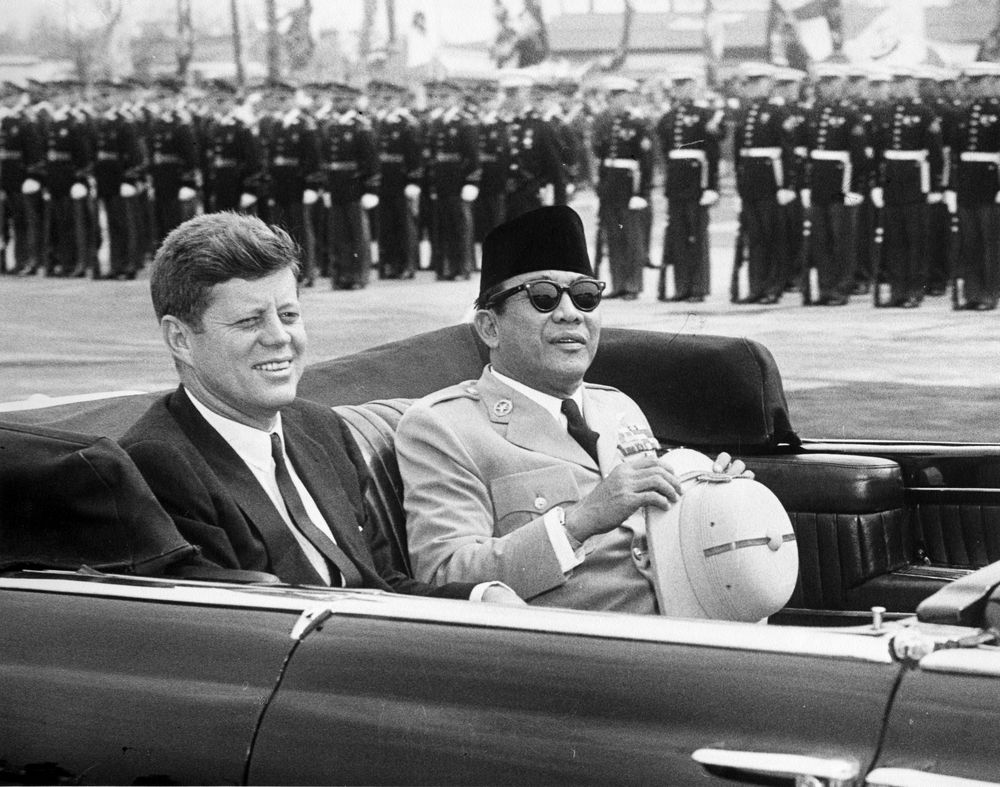
Sukarno with John F. Kennedy in 1961

In JFK vs Allen Dulles, the author Greg Poulgrain describes an attempt by America's Rockefeller family to gain control over West Irian gold mines in Indonesia, in particular the substantially gold-rich Grasberg mine. Poulgrain speculates that President Kennedy's close relationship with Indonesian President Sukarno and a planned 1964 US–Indonesian summit could have led to Indonesia granting independence to West Irian, making it difficult for Rockefeller-owned Freeport Sulphur to gain control of the mines.

Poulgrain contends that Allen Dulles, who had ties to the Rockefellers through his employment at Sullivan & Cromwell, organized the assassination on the Rockefellers' behalf to eliminate Kennedy's interference by easing Lee Harvey Oswald's return to the United States and getting him a job at the Texas School Book Depository, before instigating a coup in Indonesia with the cooperation of military officer Suharto to discredit the Communist Party of Indonesia. The subsequent nationwide massacres and Suharto's assumption of the presidency, Poulgrain purports, led to Freeport securing the mines with the approval of Suharto's pro-Western government.

In the biographical book, The Devil's Chessboard: Allen Dulles, the CIA, and the Rise of America's Secret Government, David Talbot examines Dulles' career. Talbot also posits that Allen Dulles orchestrated the assassination of President Kennedy at the behest of corporate leaders, though on the basis of their perceiving Kennedy as a threat to national security instead of to primarily secure any specific business interests. According to Talbot, Dulles lobbied the new president, Lyndon Johnson, to have himself appointed to the Warren Commission. Talbot says that Allen Dulles also arranged to make Lee Harvey Oswald the person responsible for the assassination. The book asserts that the conspirators behind John Kennedy's death also murdered his brother Robert Kennedy, whom the conspirators perceived to be "a wild card, an uncontrollable threat" that would reveal the plot.

=== Military-industrial complex ===
In the farewell speech given by U.S. President Dwight D. Eisenhower before he left office on January 17, 1961, he warned Americans about the power of the military establishment and the arms industry. "In the councils of government, we must guard against the acquisition of unwarranted influence, whether sought or unsought, by the military-industrial complex. The potential for the disastrous rise of misplaced power exists, and will persist." Some conspiracy theorists have argued that Kennedy planned to end the involvement of the United States in Vietnam, and was therefore targeted by those who had an interest in sustained military conflict, including the Pentagon and defense contractors.

The former United States Senator Ralph Yarborough in 1991 stated: "Had Kennedy lived, I think we would have had no Vietnam War, with all of its traumatic and divisive influences in America. I think we would have escaped that." According to the author James W. Douglass, Kennedy was assassinated because he was turning away from the Cold War and seeking a negotiated peace with the Soviet Union. Douglass argued that this "was not the kind of leadership the CIA, the Joint Chiefs of Staff, and the military-industrial complex wanted in the White House." Oliver Stone's film JFK explored the possibility that Kennedy was killed by a conspiracy involving the military-industrial complex. L. Fletcher Prouty, Chief of Special Operations for the Joint Chiefs of Staff under Kennedy, and the person who inspired the character "Mr. X" in Stone's film, wrote that Kennedy's assassination was actually a coup d'état.

=== Secret Service conspiracy ===
The House Select Committee on Assassinations reported that it investigated "alleged Secret Service complicity in the assassination" and concluded that the Secret Service was not involved. However, the HSCA declared that "the Secret Service was deficient in the performance of its duties." Among its findings, the HSCA noted: (1) that President Kennedy had not received adequate protection in Dallas, (2) that the Secret Service possessed information that was not properly analyzed, investigated, or used by the Secret Service in connection with the President's trip to Dallas, and (3) that the Secret Service agents in the motorcade were inadequately prepared to protect the President from a sniper. The HSCA specifically noted:

No actions were taken by the agent in the right front seat of the presidential limousine Roy Kellerman to cover the President with his body, although it would have been consistent with Secret Service procedure for him to have done so. The primary function of the agent was to remain at all times in close proximity to the President in the event of such emergencies.

Some argue that the lack of Secret Service protection occurred because Kennedy himself had asked that the Secret Service make itself discreet during the Dallas visit. However, Vince Palamara, who interviewed several Secret Service agents assigned to the Kennedy detail, disputes this. Palamara reports that Secret Service driver Sam Kinney told him that requests – such as removing the bubble top from the limousine in Dallas, not having agents positioned beside the limousine's rear bumper, and reducing the number of Dallas police motorcycle outriders near the limousine's rear bumper – were not made by Kennedy.

In The Echo from Dealey Plaza, Abraham Bolden – the first African American on the White House Secret Service detail – claimed to have overheard agents say that they would not protect Kennedy from would-be assassins. Questions regarding the forthrightness of the Secret Service increased in the 1990s when the Assassination Records Review Board – which was created when Congress passed the JFK Records Act – requested access to Secret Service records. The Review Board was told by the Secret Service that in January 1995, in violation of the JFK Records Act, the Secret Service destroyed protective survey reports that covered JFK's trips from September 24 through November 8, 1963.

=== Cuban exiles ===
The House Select Committee on Assassinations wrote: "The committee believes, on the basis of the evidence available to it, that anti-Castro Cuban groups, as groups, were not involved in the assassination of President Kennedy, but that the available evidence does not preclude the possibility that individual members may have been involved". With the 1959 Cuban Revolution that brought Fidel Castro to power, many Cubans left Cuba to live in the United States. Many of these exiles hoped to overthrow Castro and return to Cuba. Their hopes were dashed with the failed Bay of Pigs Invasion in 1961, and many blamed President Kennedy for the failure. The House Select Committee on Assassinations concluded that some militant Cuban exiles might have participated in Kennedy's murder. These exiles worked closely with CIA operatives in violent activities against Castro's Cuba. In 1979, the committee reported:

President Kennedy's popularity among the Cuban exiles had plunged deeply by 1963. Their bitterness is illustrated in a tape recording of a meeting of anti-Castro Cubans and right-wing Americans in the Dallas suburb of Farmer's Branch on October 1, 1963.

Author Joan Didion explored the Miami anti-Castro Cuban theory in her 1987 book Miami. She discussed Marita Lorenz's testimony regarding Guillermo Novo, a Cuban exile who, in 1964, was involved in shooting a bazooka at the headquarters of the United Nations building from the East River during a speech by Che Guevara. Allegedly, Novo was affiliated with Lee Harvey Oswald, and Frank Sturgis. Lorenz claimed that she, Oswald, and seven anti-Castro Cubans transported weapons from Miami to Dallas in two cars just prior to the assassination. These claims, though put forth to the House Assassinations Committee by Lorenz, have never been substantiated. Don DeLillo dramatized the Cuban theory in his 1988 novel Libra.

=== Organized crime conspiracy ===
In 1964, the Warren Commission found no evidence linking Ruby's killing of Oswald with any broader conspiracy to assassinate President Kennedy. The Commission concluded: "Based on its evaluation of the record, the Commission believes that the evidence does not establish a significant link between Ruby and organized crime. Both State and Federal officials have indicated that Ruby was not affiliated with organized criminal activity."

However, in 1979, the House Select Committee on Assassinations wrote: "The committee believes, on the basis of the evidence available to it, that the national syndicate of organized crime, as a group, was not involved in the assassination of President Kennedy, but that the available evidence does not preclude the possibility that individual members may have been involved". Already in 1973 the journalist Peter Noyes had published the book Legacy of Doubt: Did the Mafia Kill JFK?, which argued that there was organized crime involvement. Robert Blakey, who was chief counsel for the House Select Committee on Assassinations, would later conclude in his book, The Plot to Kill the President (co-written with Richard N. Billings) that New Orleans Mafia boss Carlos Marcello was likely part of a Mafia conspiracy behind the assassination, and that the Mafia had the means and the opportunity required to carry it out. In 1992 a revised edition of the book was released, retitled Fatal Hour: The Assassination of President Kennedy by Organized Crime.

In a 1993 Washington Post article, Blakey added: "It is difficult to dispute the underworld pedigree of Jack Ruby, though the Warren Commission did it in 1964. Author Gerald Posner similarly ignores Ruby's ties to Joseph Civello, the organized crime boss in Dallas. His relationship with Joseph Campisi, the No. 2 man in the mob in Dallas, is even more difficult to ignore. In fact, Campisi and Ruby were close friends; they had dinner together at Campisi's restaurant, the Egyptian Lounge, on the night before the assassination. After Ruby was jailed for killing Oswald, Campisi regularly visited him. The select committee thought Campisi's connection to Marcello was telling; he told us, for example, that every year at Christmas he sent 260 pounds of Italian sausage to Marcello, a sort of Mafia tribute. We also learned that he called New Orleans up to 20 times a day."

In 1988 David E. Scheim, a manager of computerized information at the National Institutes of Health, published Contract on America: The Mafia Murder of President John F. Kennedy. It featured on The New York Times Best Seller List. In 1989 the journalist John H. Davis, who had penned the introduction to Scheim's book, published his own work, entitled Mafia Kingfish: Carlos Marcello and the Assassination of John F. Kennedy, in which he implicated Carlos Marcello as the ring leader of an assassination plot. He followed this up with The Kennedy Contract: The Mafia Plot to Assassinate the President in 1993.

Government documents have revealed that some members of the Mafia worked with the Central Intelligence Agency on assassination attempts against Cuban leader Fidel Castro. In summer 1960, the CIA recruited ex-FBI agent Robert Maheu to approach the West Coast representative of the Chicago mob, Johnny Roselli. When Maheu contacted Roselli, Maheu hid the fact that he was sent by the CIA, instead portraying himself as an advocate for international corporations. He offered to pay $150,000 to have Castro killed, but Roselli declined any pay. Roselli introduced Maheu to two men he referred to as "Sam Gold" and "Joe". "Sam Gold" was Sam Giancana; "Joe" was Santo Trafficante Jr., the Tampa, Florida, boss and one of the most powerful mobsters in pre-revolution Cuba. Glenn Kessler of The Washington Post explained: "After Fidel Castro led a revolution that toppled a friendly government in 1959, the CIA was desperate to eliminate him. So the agency sought out a partner equally worried about Castro – the Mafia, which had lucrative investments in Cuban casinos."

In his memoir, Bound by Honor, Bill Bonanno, son of New York Mafia boss Joseph Bonanno, disclosed that several Mafia families had long-standing ties with the anti-Castro Cubans through the Havana casinos operated by the Mafia before the Cuban Revolution. Many Cuban exiles and Mafia bosses disliked President Kennedy, blaming him for the failed Bay of Pigs Invasion. They also disliked his brother, then United States Attorney General Robert F. Kennedy, who had conducted an unprecedented legal assault on organized crime. This was especially provocative because several Mafia "families" had allegedly worked with JFK's father, Joseph Kennedy, to get JFK elected. Both the Mafia and the anti-Castro Cubans were experts in assassination – the Cubans having been trained by the CIA. Bonanno reported that he recognized the high degree of involvement of other Mafia families when Jack Ruby killed Oswald, since Bonanno was aware that Ruby was an associate of Chicago mobster Sam Giancana.

Some conspiracy researchers have alleged a plot involving elements of the Mafia, the CIA, and the anti-Castro Cubans, including Anthony Summers, who stated: "Sometimes people sort of glaze over about the notion that the Mafia and U.S. intelligence and the anti-Castro activists were involved together in the assassination of President Kennedy. In fact, there's no contradiction there. Those three groups were all in bed together at the time and had been for several years in the fight to topple Fidel Castro." News reporter Ruben Castaneda wrote in 2012: "Based on the evidence, it is likely that JFK was killed by a coalition of anti-Castro Cubans, the Mob, and elements of the CIA." In his book, They Killed Our President, former Minnesota governor Jesse Ventura concluded: "John F. Kennedy was murdered by a conspiracy involving disgruntled CIA agents, anti-Castro Cubans, and members of the Mafia, all of whom were extremely angry at what they viewed as Kennedy's appeasement policies toward Communist Cuba and the Soviet Union."

Carlos Marcello allegedly threatened to assassinate the President to short-circuit his younger brother, Attorney General Robert Kennedy, who was leading the administration's anti-Mafia crusade. Information released in 2006 by the FBI has led some to conclude that Carlos Marcello confessed to his cellmate in Texas, Jack Van Lanningham, an FBI informant, using a transistor radio that was bugged by the FBI, to having organized Kennedy's assassination, and that the FBI covered up this information that it had in its possession.

In his book, Contract on America, David Scheim provided evidence that Mafia leaders Carlos Marcello, Santo Trafficante Jr., and Jimmy Hoffa ordered the assassination of President Kennedy. Scheim cited in particular a 25-fold increase in the number of out-of-state telephone calls from Jack Ruby to associates of these crime bosses in the months before the assassination, and to an attempted confession by Jack Ruby while in prison. David E. Kaiser has also suggested mob involvement in his book, The Road to Dallas.

Investigative reporter Jack Anderson concluded that Fidel Castro worked with organized crime figures to arrange the JFK assassination. In his book Peace, War, and Politics, Anderson claimed that Mafia member Johnny Roselli gave him extensive details of the plot. Anderson said that although he was never able to independently confirm Roselli's entire story, many of Roselli's details checked out. Anderson said that Oswald may have played a role in the assassination, but that more than one gunman was involved. Johnny Roselli, as previously noted, had worked with the CIA on assassination attempts against Castro.

The History Channel program The Men Who Killed Kennedy presented additional claims of organized crime involvement. Christian David was a Corsican Mafia member interviewed in prison. He said that he was offered the assassination contract on President Kennedy, but that he did not accept it. However, he said that he knew the men who did accept the contract. According to David, there were three shooters. He provided the name of one – Lucien Sarti. David said that since the other two shooters were still alive, it would break a code of conduct for him to identify them. When asked what the shooters were wearing, David noted their modus operandi was to dress in costumes such as official uniforms. Much of Christian David's testimony was confirmed by former Corsican member Michelle Nicole, who was part of the DEA witness protection program.

The book Ultimate Sacrifice, by Lamar Waldron and Thom Hartmann, attempted to synthesize these theories with new evidence. The authors argued that government officials felt obliged to help the assassins cover up the truth because the assassination conspiracy had direct ties to American government plots to assassinate Castro. Outraged at Robert Kennedy's attack on organized crime, mob leaders had President Kennedy killed to remove Robert from power. A government investigation of the plot was thwarted, the authors allege, because it would have revealed embarrassing evidence of American government involvement with organized crime in plots to kill Castro.

=== Lyndon B. Johnson conspiracy ===
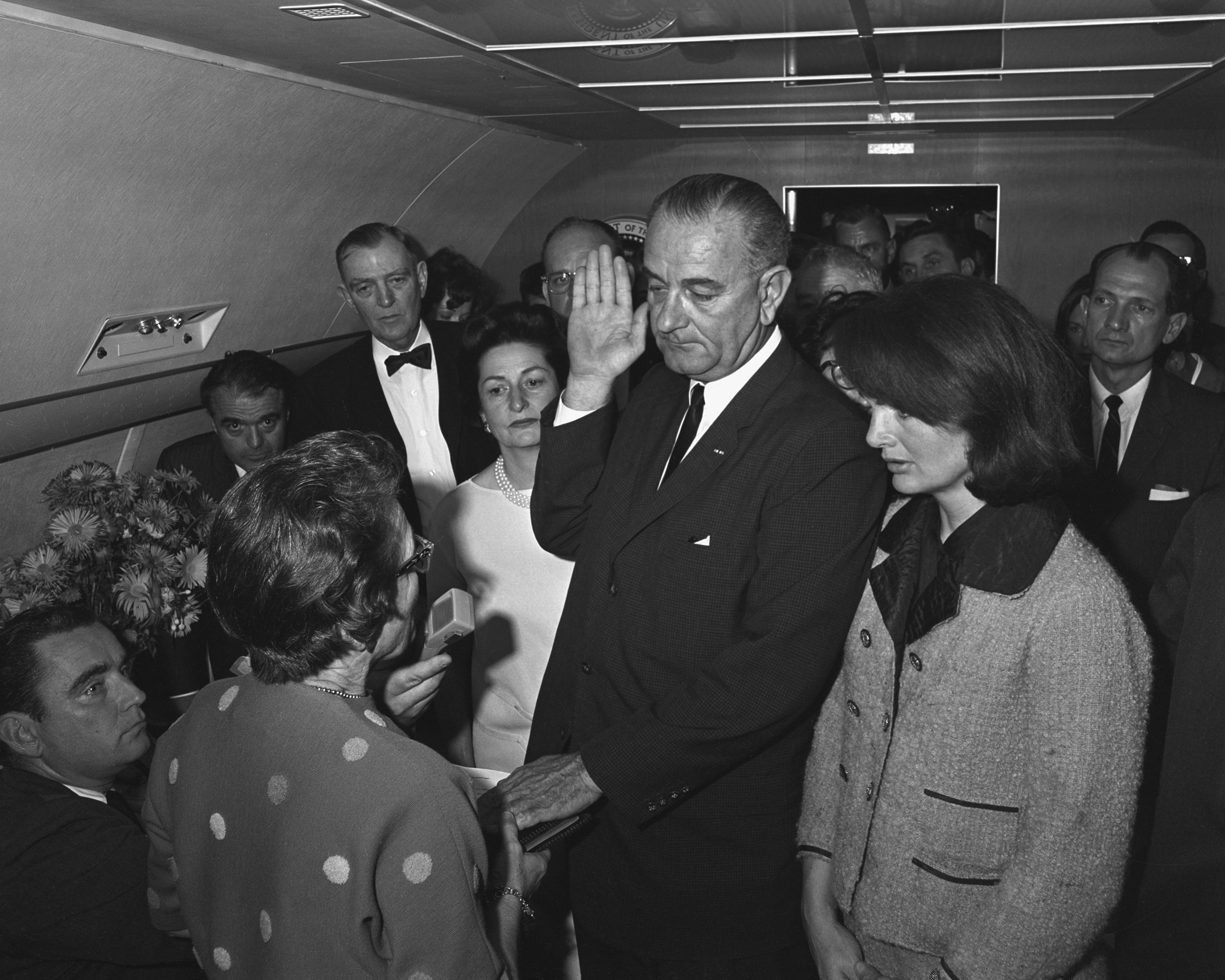
Johnson is sworn in on Air Force One.

A 2003 Gallup poll indicated that nearly 20% of Americans suspected Lyndon B. Johnson of being involved in the assassination of Kennedy. Critics of the Warren Commission have accused Johnson of plotting the assassination because he "disliked" the Kennedys and feared that he would be dropped from the Democratic ticket for the 1964 election.

According to journalist Max Holland, the first published allegation that Johnson perpetrated the assassination of Kennedy appeared in Penn Jones Jr.'s book Forgive My Grief, self-published in May 1966. In the book, Jones provided excerpts of a letter purported to have been authored by Jack Ruby charging LBJ with the murder of the President. With his 1968 book, The Dark Side of Lyndon Baines Johnson, Joachim Joesten is credited by Bugliosi as being the first conspiracy author to accuse Johnson of having a role in the assassination.

According to Joesten, Johnson "played the leading part" in a conspiracy that involved "the Dallas oligarchy and ... local branches of the CIA, the FBI, and the Secret Service". Others who have indicated there was complicity on the part of Johnson include Jim Marrs, Ralph D. Thomas, J. Gary Shaw, Larry Harris, Walt Brown, Noel Twyman, Barr McClellan, Craig Zirbel, Phillip F. Nelson, and Madeleine Brown.

The fact that JFK was seriously considering dropping Johnson from the ticket in favor of North Carolina Governor Terry Sanford should Kennedy run in 1964 has been cited as a possible motive for Johnson's complicity in the assassination. In 1968, Kennedy's personal secretary Evelyn Lincoln wrote in her book, Kennedy and Johnson, that President Kennedy had told her that Lyndon B. Johnson would be replaced as Vice President of the United States. That conversation took place on November 19, 1963, just three days before the assassination of President Kennedy and was recorded that evening in her diary and reads as follows:

As Mr. Kennedy sat in the rocker in my office, his head resting on its back he placed his left leg across his right knee. He rocked slightly as he talked. In a slow pensive voice he said to me, 'You know if I am re-elected in sixty-four, I am going to spend more and more time toward making government service an honorable career. I would like to tailor the executive and legislative branches of government so that they can keep up with the tremendous strides and progress being made in other fields.' 'I am going to advocate changing some of the outmoded rules and regulations in the Congress, such as the seniority rule. To do this I will need as a running mate in sixty-four a man who believes as I do.' Mrs. Lincoln went on to write "I was fascinated by this conversation and wrote it down verbatim in my diary. Now I asked, 'Who is your choice as a running-mate?' 'He looked straight ahead, and without hesitating he replied, 'at this time I am thinking about Governor Terry Sanford of North Carolina. But it will not be Lyndon.'

In 2003, researcher Barr McClellan published the book Blood, Money & Power. McClellan claims that Johnson, motivated by the fear of being dropped from the Kennedy ticket in 1964 and the need to cover up various scandals, masterminded Kennedy's assassination with the help of his friend, attorney Edward A. Clark. The book suggests that a smudged partial fingerprint from the sniper's nest likely belonged to Johnson's associate Malcolm "Mac" Wallace, and that Mac Wallace was, therefore, on the sixth floor of the Depository at the time of the shooting. The book further claims that the killing of Kennedy was paid for by oil magnates, including Clint Murchison and H. L. Hunt. McClellan states that the assassination of Kennedy allowed the oil depletion allowance to be kept at 27.5 percent. It remained unchanged during the Johnson presidency. According to McClellan, this resulted in a saving of over $100 million to the American oil industry. McClellan's book subsequently became the subject of an episode of Nigel Turner's ongoing documentary television series, The Men Who Killed Kennedy. The episode, "The Guilty Men", drew angry condemnation from the Johnson family, Johnson's former aides, and former Presidents Gerald Ford (who was a member of the Warren Commission) and Jimmy Carter following its airing on The History Channel. The History Channel assembled a committee of historians who concluded the accusations in the documentary were without merit, and The History Channel apologized to the Johnson family and agreed not to air the series in the future.

Madeleine Brown, who alleged she was the mistress of Johnson, also implicated him in a conspiracy to kill Kennedy. In 1997, Brown said that Johnson, along with H. L. Hunt, had begun planning Kennedy's demise as early as 1960. Brown claimed that by its fruition in 1963, the conspiracy involved dozens of persons, including the leadership of the FBI and the Mafia, as well as prominent politicians and journalists. In the documentary The Men Who Killed Kennedy, Madeleine Brown and May Newman, an employee of Texas oilman Clint Murchison, both placed FBI Director J. Edgar Hoover at a social gathering at Murchison's mansion the night before the assassination.

Also in attendance, according to Brown, were John McCloy, Richard Nixon, George Brown, R. L. Thornton, and H. L. Hunt. Madeleine Brown claimed that Johnson arrived at the gathering late in the evening and, in a "grating whisper", told her that the "... Kennedys will never embarrass me again – that's no threat – that's a promise." Brown said that on New Year's Eve 1963, she met Johnson at the Driskill Hotel in Austin, Texas, and that he confirmed the conspiracy to kill Kennedy, insisting that "the fat cats of Texas and [U.S.] intelligence" had been responsible. Brown reiterated her allegations against Johnson in the 2006 documentary Evidence of Revision. In the same documentary, several other Johnson associates also voiced their suspicions of Johnson.

Dr. Charles Crenshaw authored the 1992 book JFK: Conspiracy of Silence, along with conspiracy theorists Jens Hansen and J. Gary Shaw. Crenshaw was a third-year surgical resident on the trauma team at Parkland Hospital that attended to President Kennedy. He also treated Oswald after he was shot by Jack Ruby. While attending to Oswald, Crenshaw said that he answered a telephone call from Lyndon Johnson. Crenshaw said that Johnson inquired about Oswald's status, and that Johnson demanded a "death-bed confession from the accused assassin [Oswald]". Crenshaw said that he relayed Johnson's message to Dr. Shires, but that Oswald was in no condition to give any statement. Critics of Crenshaw's allegation state that Johnson was in his limousine at the moment the call would have been made, that no one in his car corroborated that the call was made, and that there is no record of such a call being routed through the White House switchboard.

Former CIA agent and Watergate figure E. Howard Hunt accused Johnson, along with several CIA agents whom he named, of complicity in the assassination in his posthumously released autobiography American Spy: My Secret History in the CIA, Watergate, and Beyond. Referencing that section of the book, Tim Weiner of The New York Times called into question the sincerity of the charges, and William F. Buckley Jr., who wrote the foreword, said material "was clearly ghostwritten". Shortly afterwards, an audio-taped "deathbed confession" in which Hunt claimed first-hand knowledge of a conspiracy, as a co-conspirator, was released by his sons; the authenticity of the confession was also met with some skepticism.

In 1984, convicted swindler Billie Sol Estes made statements to a Grand Jury in Texas indicating that he had "inside knowledge" that implicated Johnson in the death of Kennedy and others. Historian Michael L. Kurtz wrote that there is no evidence suggesting that Johnson ordered the assassination of Kennedy. According to Kurtz, Johnson believed Fidel Castro was responsible for the assassination and that Johnson covered up the truth because he feared the possibility that retaliatory measures against Cuba might escalate to nuclear war with the Soviet Union.

In 2012, biographer Robert Caro published his fourth volume on Johnson's career, The Passage of Power, which chronicles Johnson's communications and actions as Vice President, and describes the events leading up to the assassination. Caro wrote that "nothing that I have found in my research" points to involvement by Johnson. Political consultant and convicted felon Roger Stone believes that Johnson orchestrated Kennedy's assassination. He also claims that Rafael Cruz, father of Texas Senator and Republican presidential candidate for the 2016 elections Ted Cruz, is tied to Lee Harvey Oswald.

=== George H. W. Bush conspiracy ===
Some critics of the official findings theorize that George H. W. Bush was involved in the assassination as a CIA operative in Dealey Plaza. In the book Plausible Denial: Was the CIA Involved in the Assassination of JFK?, American attorney Mark Lane suggests that Bush worked out of a Houston office as a CIA agent at the time of the assassination. In the book Family of Secrets, Russ Baker contends that Bush became an intelligence agent in his teenage years and was later at the center of a plot to assassinate Kennedy that included his father, Prescott Bush, Vice President Lyndon B. Johnson, CIA Director Allen Dulles, Cuban and Russian exiles and emigrants, and various Texas oilmen. According to Baker, Bush was in Dallas on the night before and morning of the assassination.

On November 29, 1963, exactly one week after the assassination, an employee of the FBI wrote in a memo that "Mr. George Bush of the Central Intelligence Agency" was given a briefing on the reaction to the assassination by Cuban exiles living in Miami. Joseph McBride speculated that the "George Bush" cited in the memo was the future U.S. president, George H. W. Bush, who was appointed head of the CIA by president Gerald Ford in 1976, 13 years after the assassination. During Bush's presidential campaign in 1988, the memo resurfaced, prompting the CIA to claim that the memo was referring to an employee named George William Bush. George William Bush disputed this suggestion, declaring under oath that "I am not the George Bush of the Central Intelligence Agency referred to in the memorandum."

In 1998, the ARRB instructed the CIA to review its personnel files of former President Bush and to provide a definitive statement as to whether he was the person referred to in the memo. The CIA responded that it had no record of any association with former President Bush during the 1963 time period. On the website JFK Facts, author Jefferson Morley writes that any communication by Bush with the FBI or CIA in November 1963 does not necessarily demonstrate culpability in the assassination, and that it is unclear whether Bush had any affiliation with the CIA prior to his appointment to head the agency in 1976.

=== Cuban government conspiracy ===
In its report, the Warren Commission stated that it had investigated "dozens of allegations of a conspiratorial contact between Oswald and agents of the Cuban Government" and had found no evidence of Cuban involvement in the assassination of President Kennedy. The House Select Committee on Assassinations also wrote: "The committee believes, on the basis of the evidence available to it, that the Cuban Government was not involved in the assassination of President Kennedy". Some conspiracy theorists continue to allege that Fidel Castro ordered the assassination of Kennedy in retaliation for the CIA's previous attempts to assassinate him.

One of the first to push this theory was the Information Council of the Americas (INCA), whose founder Edward S. Butler had debated Oswald on New Orleans local radio prior to the assassination. In 1966 it produced a television program narrated by Butler entitled "Hitler in Havana", which suggested that Castro had culpability in the assassination of President Kennedy. The Directorio Revolucionario Estudiantil (DRE), whose member Carlos Bringuier had taken part in that same radio debate, rushed out the next issue of their paper Trinchera in the assassination's aftermath, with the headline "The Presumed Assassins" next to photos of Oswald and Castro. In 1969 Bringuier published the book Red Friday, wherein he argued that Oswald was working for Castro.

In the early 1960s, Clare Boothe Luce, wife of Time-Life publisher Henry Luce, was one of a number of prominent Americans who sponsored anti-Castro groups. This support included funding exiles in commando speedboat raids against Cuba. In 1975, Clare Luce said that on the night of the assassination, she received a call from a member of a commando group she had sponsored. According to Luce, the caller's name was "something like" Julio Fernandez and he claimed he was calling her from New Orleans.

According to Luce, Fernandez told her that Oswald had approached his group with an offer to help assassinate Castro. Fernandez further claimed that he and his associates eventually found out that Oswald was a communist and supporter of Castro. He said that with this new-found knowledge, his group kept a close watch on Oswald until Oswald suddenly came into money and went to Mexico City and then Dallas. According to Luce, Fernandez told her, "There is a Cuban Communist assassination team at large and Oswald was their hired gun."

Luce said that she told the caller to give his information to the FBI. Luce revealed the details of the incident to both the Church Committee and the HSCA. Both committees investigated the incident, but were unable to uncover any evidence to corroborate the allegations. In May 1967, CIA Director Richard Helms told President Lyndon Johnson that the CIA had tried to assassinate Castro. Helms further stated that the CIA had employed members of the Mafia in this effort, and "... that CIA plots to assassinate Fidel Castro dated back to August of 1960 – to the Eisenhower Administration." Helms said that the plots against Castro continued into the Kennedy Administration and that Attorney General Robert Kennedy had known about both the plots and the Mafia's involvement.

On separate occasions, Johnson told two prominent television newsmen that he believed that JFK's assassination had been organized by Castro as retaliation for the CIA's efforts to kill Castro. In October 1968, Johnson told veteran newsman Howard K. Smith of ABC that "Kennedy was trying to get to Castro, but Castro got to him first." In September 1969, in an interview with Walter Cronkite of CBS, Johnson said in regard to the assassination, "[I could not] honestly say that I've ever been completely relieved of the fact that there might have been international connections", and referenced unnamed "others". Finally, in 1971, Johnson told his former speechwriter Leo Janos of Time magazine that he "never believed that Oswald acted alone".

When the news that Kennedy had been shot reached Castro, he was being interviewed by the French journalist Jean Daniel. Daniel recalls that when Castro found out about the events in Dallas he said "this is bad news" because Kennedy was "a man you can talk with" and that "anyone else would be worse".

In 1977, Castro was interviewed by newsman Bill Moyers. Castro denied any involvement in Kennedy's death, saying:

It would have been absolute insanity by Cuba. ... It would have been a provocation. Needless to say, it would have been to run the risk that our country would have been destroyed by the United States. Nobody who's not insane could have thought about [killing Kennedy in retaliation].

When Castro was interviewed later in 2013 by Atlantic editor, Jeffrey Goldberg, Castro said:

There were people in the American government who thought Kennedy was a traitor because he didn't invade Cuba when he had the chance, when they were asking him. He was never forgiven for that.

=== Soviet government conspiracy ===
The Warren Commission reported that they found no evidence that the Soviet Union was involved in the assassination of President Kennedy. The House Select Committee on Assassinations also wrote: "The committee believes, on the basis of the evidence available to it, that the Soviet Government was not involved in the assassination of President Kennedy". According to some conspiracy theorists, the Soviet Union, under the leadership of Nikita Khrushchev, was responsible for the assassination, motivated by the humiliation of having to back down during the Cuban Missile Crisis.

According to a 1966 FBI document, Colonel Boris Ivanov – chief of the KGB Residency in New York City at the time of the assassination – stated that it was his personal opinion that the assassination had been planned by an organized group, rather than a lone individual. The same document stated, "... officials of the Communist Party of the Soviet Union believed there was some well-organized conspiracy on the part of the 'ultraright' in the United States to effect a 'coup.'" They also feared that some anti-communists would use Kennedy's assassination as an excuse to end negotiations with the Soviet Union.

Much later, the high-ranking Soviet Bloc intelligence defector, Lt. Gen. Ion Mihai Pacepa, said that he had a conversation with Nicolae Ceauşescu who told him about "ten international leaders the Kremlin killed or tried to kill", including Kennedy. He claimed that "among the leaders of Moscow's satellite intelligence services there was unanimous agreement that the KGB had been involved in the assassination of President Kennedy." Pacepa later released a book, Programmed to Kill: Lee Harvey Oswald, the Soviet KGB, and the Kennedy Assassination, in 2007. Similar views on the JFK assassination were expressed by Robert Holmes, former First Secretary at the British Embassy in Moscow, in his 2012 book Spy Like No Other.

=== Decoy hearse and wound alteration ===
David Lifton presented a scenario in which conspirators on Air Force One removed Kennedy's body from its original bronze casket and placed it in a shipping casket, while en route from Dallas to Washington. Once the presidential plane arrived at Andrews Air Force Base, the shipping casket with the President's body in it was surreptitiously taken by helicopter from the side of the plane that was out of the television camera's view. Kennedy's body was then taken to an unknown location – most likely Walter Reed Army Medical Center – to surgically alter the body to make it appear that he was shot only from the rear.

Part of Lifton's theory comes from a House Select Committee on Assassinations report of an interview of Lt. Richard Lipsey on January 18, 1978, by committee staff members Donald Purdy and Mark Flanagan. According to the report, Lt. Richard Lipsey said that he and General Wehle had met President Kennedy's body at Andrews Air Force Base. Lipsey "... placed [the casket] in a hearse to be transported to Bethesda Naval Hospital. Lipsey mentioned that he and Wehle then flew by helicopter to Bethesda and took [the body of] JFK into the back of Bethesda." Lipsey said that "a decoy hearse had been driven to the front [of Bethesda]". With Lipsey's mention of a "decoy hearse" at Bethesda, Lifton theorized that the casket removed by Lipsey from Air Force One – from the side of the plane exposed to television – was probably also a decoy and was likely empty.

Laboratory technologist Paul O'Connor was one of the major witnesses supporting another part of David Lifton's theory that somewhere between Parkland and Bethesda the President's body was made to appear as if it had been shot only from the rear. O'Connor said that President Kennedy's body arrived at Bethesda inside a body bag in "a cheap, shipping-type of casket", which differed from the description of the ornamental bronze casket and sheet that the body had been wrapped in at Parkland Hospital. O'Connor said that the brain had already been removed by the time it got to Bethesda, and that there were "just little pieces" of brain matter left inside the skull.

Researcher David R. Wrone dismissed the theory that Kennedy's body was surreptitiously removed from the presidential plane, stating that as is done with all cargo on airplanes for safety precautions, the coffin and lid were held by steel wrapping cables to prevent shifting during takeoff and landing and in case of air disturbances in flight. According to Wrone, the side of the plane away from the television camera "was bathed in klieg lights, and thousands of persons watched along the fence that bent backward along that side, providing, in effect, a well-lit and very public stage for any would-be body snatchers".

=== Federal Reserve conspiracy ===
Jim Marrs, in his book Crossfire, presented the theory that Kennedy was trying to rein in the power of the Federal Reserve, and that forces opposed to such action might have played at least some part in the assassination. According to Marrs, the issuance of Executive Order 11110 was an effort by Kennedy to transfer power from the Federal Reserve to the United States Department of the Treasury by replacing Federal Reserve Notes with silver certificates. Actor and author Richard Belzer named the responsible parties in this theory as American "billionaires, power brokers, and bankers ... working in tandem with the CIA and other sympathetic agents of the government".

A 2010 article in Research magazine discussing various controversies surrounding the Federal Reserve stated that "the wildest accusation against the Fed is that it was involved in Kennedy's assassination." Critics of the theory note that Kennedy called for and signed legislation phasing out Silver Certificates in favor of Federal Reserve Notes, thereby enhancing the power of the Federal Reserve; and that Executive Order 11110 was a technicality that only delegated existing presidential powers to the Secretary of the Treasury for administrative convenience during a period of transition.

=== Israeli government conspiracy ===
Immediately following Kennedy's death, speculation that he was assassinated by a "Zionist conspiracy" was prevalent in much of the Muslim world. Among these views were that Zionists were motivated to kill Kennedy due to his opposition to an Israeli nuclear program, that Lyndon B. Johnson received orders from Zionists to have Kennedy killed, and that the assassin was a Zionist agent.

According to Michael Collins Piper in Final Judgment: The Missing Link in the JFK Assassination Controversy, Israeli Prime Minister David Ben-Gurion orchestrated the assassination after learning that Kennedy planned to keep Israel from obtaining nuclear weapons. Piper said that the assassination "was a joint enterprise conducted on the highest levels of the American CIA, in collaboration with organized crime – and most specifically, with direct and profound involvement by the Israeli intelligence service, the Mossad." The theory alleges involvement of Meyer Lansky and the Anti-Defamation League. In 2004, Mordechai Vanunu stated that the assassination was Israel's response to "pressure [Kennedy] exerted on ... Ben-Gurion, to shed light on Dimona's nuclear reactor in Israel". In a speech before the United Nations General Assembly in 2009, Libyan leader Muammar Gaddafi also alleged that Kennedy was killed for wanting to investigate Dimona.

=== Other published theories ===
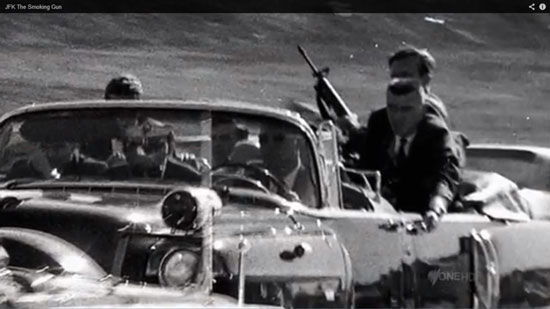
Secret Service Agent George Hickey holding his AR-15 rifle

- Reasonable Doubt (1985) by Henry Hurt, who writes about his Warren Commission doubts. Hurt pins the plot on professional crook Robert Easterling, along with Texas oilmen and the supposed Ferrie/Shaw alliance. ISBN 0-03-004059-0.
- Behold a Pale Horse (1991) by William Cooper alleges that Kennedy was shot by the presidential limousine's driver, Secret Service agent William Greer. In the Zapruder film, Greer can be seen turning to his right and looking backwards, just before speeding away from Dealey Plaza. This theory has come under severe criticism from others in the research community. ISBN 0-929385-22-5.
- Former Secret Service agent Abraham Bolden's The Echo from Dealey Plaza (2008) (ISBN 978-0-307-38201-6) and Kevin James Shay's Death of the Rising Sun (2017) (ISBN 978-1-881-36556-3) detail plots that occurred shortly before Kennedy's trip to Dallas in 1963, in Chicago and Florida. Within the Secret Service during those chaotic months, "rumors were flying" about Cuban dissidents and right-wing southerners who were stalking Kennedy for a chance to kill him, Bolden wrote. The security threat in Chicago on November 2, 1963, involved former Marine Thomas Arthur Vallee, who was arrested after police found an M-1 rifle, a handgun, and 3,000 rounds of ammunition in his apartment. A high-powered rifle was confiscated from another suspected conspirator in Chicago shortly before Kennedy's trip there was canceled, Bolden said. Authorities also cited similar threats in Kennedy's Tampa, Fla., and Miami visits on November 18.
- Mark North's Act of Treason: The Role of J. Edgar Hoover in the Assassination of President Kennedy, (1991) implicates the FBI Director. North documents that Hoover was aware of threats against Kennedy by organized crime before 1963, and suggests that he failed to take proper action to prevent the assassination. North also charges Hoover with failure to work adequately to uncover the truth behind Kennedy's murder, ISBN 0-88184-877-8.
- Mortal Error: The Shot That Killed JFK (1992) by Bonar Menninger (ISBN 0-312-08074-3) alleges that while Oswald did attempt to assassinate JFK and did succeed in wounding him, the fatal shot was accidentally fired by Secret Service agent George Hickey, who was riding in the Secret Service follow-up car directly behind the presidential limousine. The theory alleges that after the first two shots were fired the motorcade sped up while Hickey was attempting to respond to Oswald's shots and he lost his balance and accidentally pulled the trigger of his AR-15 and the shot fatally hit JFK. Hickey's testimony says otherwise: "At the end of the last report (shot) I reached to the bottom of the car and picked up the AR 15 rifle, cocked and loaded it, and turned to the rear." (italics added). George Hickey sued Menninger in April 1995 for what he had written in Mortal Error. The case was dismissed as its statute of limitations had run out. The theory received public attention in 2013 when it was supported by Colin McLaren's book and documentary titled JFK: The Smoking Gun (ISBN 978-0-7336-3044-6). No Secret Service agent fired a weapon that day.
- Who Shot JFK? : A Guide to the Major Conspiracy Theories (1993) by Bob Callahan and Mark Zingarelli explores some of the more obscure theories regarding JFK's murder, such as "The Coca-Cola Theory". According to this theory, suggested by the editor of an organic gardening magazine, Oswald killed JFK due to mental impairment stemming from an addiction to refined sugar, as evidenced by his need for his favorite beverage immediately after the assassination. ISBN 0-671-79494-9.
- Passport to Assassination (1993) by Oleg M. Nechiporenko, the Soviet consular official (and highly placed KGB officer) who met with Oswald in Mexico City in 1963. He was afforded the unique opportunity to interview Oswald about his goals including his genuine desire for a Cuban visa. His conclusions were: (1) that Oswald killed Kennedy due to extreme feelings of inadequacy versus his wife's professed admiration for JFK, and (2) that the KGB never sought intelligence information from Oswald during his time in the USSR as they did not trust his motivations. ISBN 1-55972-210-X.
- Norman Mailer's Oswald's Tale: An American Mystery (1995) concludes that Oswald was guilty, but holds that the evidence may point to a second gunman on the grassy knoll, who, purely by coincidence, was attempting to kill JFK at the same time as Oswald. "If there was indeed another shot, it was not necessarily fired by a conspirator of Oswald's. Such a gun could have belonged to another lone killer or to a conspirator working for some other group altogether." ISBN 0-679-42535-7.
- David Wrone's The Zapruder Film (2003) concludes that JFK's head wound and his throat and back wounds were caused by in-and-through shots originating from the grassy knoll. Three shots were fired from three different angles, none of them from the sixth floor window of the Texas School Book Depository. Wrone is a professor of history (emeritus) at the University of Wisconsin–Stevens Point. ISBN 0-7006-1291-2.
- The Gemstone File: A Memoir (2006), by Stephanie Caruana, posits that Oswald was part of a 28-man assassination team that included three U.S. Mafia hitmen (Jimmy Fratianno, John Roselli, and Eugene Brading). Oswald's role was to shoot John Connally. Bruce Roberts, author of the Gemstone File papers, claimed that the JFK assassination scenario was modeled after a supposed attempted assassination of President F.D. Roosevelt. Roosevelt was riding in an open car with Mayor Anton Cermak of Chicago. Cermak was shot and killed by Giuseppe Zangara. In Dallas, JFK was the real target, and Connally was a secondary target. The JFK assassination is only a small part of the Gemstone File's account. ISBN 1-4120-6137-7.
- In "Allegations of PFC Eugene Dinkin", the Mary Farrell Foundation summarizes and archives documents related to Private First Class Eugene B. Dinkin, a cryptographic code operator stationed in Metz, France, who went AWOL in early November 1963, entered Switzerland using a false ID, and visited the United Nations' press office and declared that officials in the U.S. government were planning to assassinate President Kennedy, adding that "something" might happen to the Commander in Chief in Texas. Dinkin was arrested nine days before Kennedy was killed, placed in psychiatric care (deemed a mad man?), and released shortly thereafter. His allegations eventually made their way to the Warren Commission, but according to the Ferrell Foundation account, the Commission "took no interest in the matter, and indeed omitted any mention of Dinkin from its purportedly encyclopedic 26 volumes of evidence."
- Described by the Associated Press as "one of the strangest theories", Hugh McDonald's Appointment in Dallas stated that the Soviet government contracted with a rogue CIA agent named "Saul" to have Kennedy killed. McDonald said he worked for the CIA "on assignment for $100 a day" and met "Saul" at the Agency's headquarters after the Bay of Pigs Invasion. According to McDonald, his CIA mentor told him that "Saul" was the world's best assassin. McDonald stated that after the assassination, he recognized the man's photo in the Warren Commission report and eventually tracked him to a London hotel in 1972. McDonald stated that "Saul" assumed he, too, was a CIA agent and confided to him that he shot Kennedy from a building on the other side of the street from the Texas School Book Depository.
- Judyth Vary Baker claims that during the summer of 1963, she had an adulterous affair with Oswald in New Orleans while working with him on a CIA bioweapons project to kill Fidel Castro. According to John McAdams, Baker presents a "classic case of pushing the limits of plausibility too far".
- Returning from the funeral of President Kennedy, Charles De Gaulle, the president of France, told his confidant Alain Peyrefitte that the Dallas police were linked to far-right segregationist "ultras" in the Ku Klux Klan, and that the far-right John Birch Society manipulated Oswald and used Jack Ruby to silence him.
- A Woman I Know: Female Spies, Double Identities, and a New Story of the Kennedy Assassination (2023) by Mary Haverstick, identifies and interviews the real-life retired (female) pilot Jerrie Cobb, who died in 2019, and suggests that she either was the same person as, or impersonated June Cobb (d. 2015), a known CIA operative who may have been part of the team that attempted to assassinate Fidel Castro. She provides statements to the effect that Cobb (apparently as "June") piloted a small twin-engined plane to the Redbird private airport (now Dallas Executive Airport) in Dallas, where it remained with engines running during the assassination of the president, purportedly to assist in spiriting away Lee Harvey Oswald, and may also herself have been involved in the assassination as a second shooter in the vicinity of the presidential limousine; her conclusion, which has received mixed responses from reviewers, is that Oswald was "set up" to conduct the assassination by a clandestine team within the CIA including William King Harvey and Arnold M. Silver.

== Notable supporters and critics of JFK assassination conspiracy theories ==
=== Supporters ===
- Jim Garrison – District Attorney for New Orleans
- Robert F. Kennedy Jr. – attorney and politician, nephew of JFK
- Mark Lane – attorney
- Marguerite Oswald – mother of Lee Harvey Oswald
- Marina Oswald Porter – wife of Lee Harvey Oswald
- L. Fletcher Prouty – military officer
- Oliver Stone – filmmaker

=== Critics ===
- Gerald Posner – investigative journalist
- John C. McAdams – professor
- Robert Oswald – brother of Lee Harvey Oswald
- Vincent Bugliosi – Deputy District Attorney in Los Angeles

== See also ==
- Conspiracy theories in United States politics
- Martin Luther King Jr. assassination conspiracy theories
- Robert F. Kennedy assassination conspiracy theories
- Assassination of John F. Kennedy in popular culture
- Assassination of John F. Kennedy in UFO conspiracy theories
