= Benchwarmer =

Bench warmer (or benchwarmer) is a sports player who is rarely, if ever selected to play, and thus merely sits on the benches and warms them up. It may also refer to:

- The Benchwarmers, 2006 American film

== See also ==
- Substitution (sport)

Other terms that use temperature to describe sharing of an item:

- Hotdesking
- Hot racking
