= Charles Brehm =

Witness to the assassination of US President John F. Kennedy

Charles F. Brehm (January 14, 1925 – August 11, 1996) was a very close witness to the assassination of United States President John F. Kennedy in Dallas, Texas, on November 22, 1963.

== Early life ==
Brehm was a World War II veteran who served in the United States Army Rangers who fought and was wounded at the Omaha Beach invasion at Pointe du Hoc, France, during D-Day. He later also served during the Korean War.

== Watched presidential motorcade with his son ==
Charles F. Brehm and his 5-year-old son, Joe, were standing in the Dealey Plaza north infield grass, a few feet south of the south curb of Elm Street. They were across the street from Abraham Zapruder and the Dealey Plaza grassy knoll. Both Brehm and Joe can be clearly seen in the Zapruder film.

When the presidential limousine turned from Main Street onto Houston Street, Brehm and his son watched from the northwest side of the intersection. After watching the turn, Brehm and Joe quickly ran northwestward across the "north infield grass" towards the south curb of Elm Street. They hoped to catch another glimpse of the President. They were standing close to the south curb, directly across the street from Bill and Gayle Newman and their two boys. The location was about 20 feet northeast from close assassination witnesses Jean Hill, and Mary Moorman, as the limousine rounded the 120-degree slow turn from Houston Street onto Elm Street. The movie-filming "babushka lady" was standing nearby to Brehm's right backside.

== Description of shots which wounded and killed JFK ==
Brehm said President Kennedy was approaching him, and was only 30 feet (9.1 m) away, when his son began to wave to President Kennedy. President Kennedy started to wave back, then Brehm heard the first shot he remembered hearing. Kennedy did not start waving until Zapruder film frame Z-171, which was after live oak tree branches and foliage had already temporarily hidden the President from Z-162 to Z-208 from being seen by anyone in the Texas School Book Depository's sixth-floor window.

Brehm stated to the Federal Bureau of Investigation that "he could see the President's face very well, the President was seated, but was leaning forward when he stiffened perceptibly. He seemed to stiffen and come to a pause. The first shot Brehm remembered hearing was also the first shot that impacted the President. The President reacted immediately to the impact."

When the President was 15 to 25 feet (4.6 to 7.6 m) away, just past Brehm's location, Brehm remembered hearing a second shot that struck President Kennedy in the head. Brehm watched the President's "hair fly up, ripple, and bits of brain and bone went flying, and then roll over to his side." President Kennedy "slumped all the way down".

On the third anniversary of the assassination, Brehm stated that he was "more than satisfied" with the Warren Commission's findings. Although he was not called to provide testimony to the commission, Brehm stated: "I see no reason why I should be called. I did not see the man who shot him. I did not see the shots fired. I don't feel that anything I would have said would have had any bearing on their outcome." He described books then-recently published by Warren Commission critics as "nothing but cheap sensationalism".

== Contributions to assassination documentaries ==
In the 1966 video documentary Rush to Judgment while speaking of the blood cloud and the bits of brain and bone matter that Brehm saw flying in the air when the President's head exploded, Brehm stated he was specifically attracted to watch a piece fly towards himself, "over in the area of the curb where I was standing." ... "It seemed to have come left, and back." ... "Sir, whatever it was that I saw did fall, both, in that direction, and, over into the curb there."

Charles Brehm was located behind, and to the President's left when the President's head first exploded.

On November 22, 1963, only minutes after the assassination, and while he was still standing within Dealey Plaza, Brehm was quoted by a newspaper reporter as saying, "He was waving, then the first shot hit him and that awful look crossed his face," and that Brehm "seemed to think the shots came from in front of, or, beside the President."

In his November 24, 1963, FBI statement, and, during the 1987 Showtime cable-TV mock trial, The Trial of Lee Harvey Oswald, Brehm testified that the shots came from either the Texas School Book Depository or the Dal-Tex building.

In a 1967 interview with Playboy Magazine, Mark Lane said "[Brehm] told me in a filmed interview that a portion of the President's skull was driven back and sharply to the left, over the rear of the President's car. Unless the laws of physics were temporarily suspended, this offers impressive corroboration for those who say the shot came from the right front of the car—in substantially the opposite direction from the Depository."

Like many other supporting witnesses, Brehm stated that he distinctly remembered hearing another separate shot after the shot which wounded the President's head. The latter shot missed hitting anyone and was the reason that Brehm quickly dragged his son to the ground, covering him protectively.

In 1988 Brehm told author Larry Sneed, "After the car passed the building coming toward us, I heard a... surprising noise, and (the President) reached with both hands up to the side of his throat and kind of stiffened out.... And when he got down in the area just past me, the second shot hit which damaged, considerably damaged, the top of his head.... That car took off in an evasive motion... and was just beyond me when a third shot went off. The third shot really frightened me! It had a completely different sound to it because it had really passed me as anybody knows who has been in down under targets in the Army or been shot at like I had been many times. You know when a bullet passes over you, the cracking sound it makes, and that bullet had an absolute crack to it. I do believe that that (third) shot was wild. It didn't hit anybody. I don't think it could have hit anybody. But it was a frightening thing to me because here was one shot that hit him, obviously; here was another shot that destroyed his head, and what was the reason for that third shot? That third shot frightened me more than the other two, and I grabbed the boy and threw him on the ground because I didn't know if we were going to have a 'shoot-'em-up' in this area."
