= Marilyn Sitzman =

Witness to the John F. Kennedy assassination

- Born: December 14, 1939; Lafayette, Colorado, U.S.
- Died: August 11, 1993 (aged 53); Mesquite, Texas, U.S.
- Education: University of Colorado at Boulder

Marilyn Sitzman (December 14, 1939 – August 11, 1993) was an American receptionist and a witness to the assassination of United States President John F. Kennedy in Dallas, Texas, on November 22, 1963. She was steadying her boss, Abraham Zapruder, as he stood atop a pergola in Dealey Plaza making what has since become to be known as the Zapruder film, the most studied record of the assassination.

== Early years ==
Sitzman was born in Lafayette, Colorado and attended the University of Colorado at Boulder before moving to Dallas. After moving to Dallas, Sitzman got a job as a receptionist at dress manufacturer Abraham Zapruder's clothing company Jennifer Juniors.

== Witness to JFK's assassination ==
Zapruder's clothing company was located in the Dal-Tex Building at 501 Elm Street, one block from Dealey Plaza through which the presidential motorcade would be passing on November 22. The Dal-Tex building is located across the street from the Texas School Book Depository. Sitzman's boss, Abraham Zapruder, arrived at work that morning without his 8 mm movie camera as he decided not to film the motorcade because it was raining that morning. By mid-morning, the rain had cleared and Zapruder's secretary Lillian Rogers encouraged him to go home to retrieve his camera to film the motorcade. Zapruder initially decided to film the motorcade from the window of his office but later decided to film from Dealey Plaza as the angle was better. He chose a concrete abutment which extends from a retaining wall that was part of the John Neely Bryan concrete pergola on the grassy knoll north of Elm Street, in Dealey Plaza. Sitzman offered to join Zapruder as he suffered from vertigo and was apprehensive about standing on the abutment unassisted. Sitzman and Zapruder climbed on top of the 4-foot (1.2 m) high pedestal. While Sitzman stood behind Zapruder and held his coat to steady him, he began filming the presidential motorcade as it turned on Houston Street onto Elm Street. The fatal head shot struck President Kennedy as his limousine passed almost directly in front of their position, 65 feet (20 m) from the center of Elm Street.

== Post-assassination ==
Sitzman was never called by the Warren Commission. In the years following the assassination, she was interviewed by various researchers and writers.

While Sitzman continued to maintain (in a 1993 interview) that the first shot she heard came from the direction of the Texas School Book Depository, she stated in a book published in 2013 that she believed there was a possibility that there was a second gunman to the left of the pergola. She is quite assertive in making that claim: "I have no qualms saying that I'm almost sure that there was someone behind the fence or in that area up there [near the fence], but I'm just as sure that they had silencers because there was no sound."

Some assassination researchers, studying vague shapes in a photograph taken by Mary Moorman from across the street just after the fatal head shot, saw the so-called "badge man" aiming a rifle from this area. Another person, Gordon Arnold, came forth in 1978 to claim that he had been standing in that area taking a film of the motorcade.

In an interview with researcher Josiah Thompson conducted on November 29, 1966, rediscovered in 1985, Sitzman gave eyewitness testimony to who was in a 3.3-foot (1.0 m) high, L-shaped concrete alcove about nine yards (8.2 m) to her right along the path from the stairway up the knoll to the area behind the pergola: a young black couple was sitting on a bench, eating lunch and drinking sodas. When the shots rang out, the couple ran along the path to the area behind the pergola. Sitzman recalled hearing a soda bottle breaking as they ran. Asked if she saw anyone else in this area between the concrete wall and the stockade fence, Sitzman said no, only the couple.

== Death ==
Sitzman died of cancer on August 11, 1993, at age 53 in Mesquite, Texas.

== In popular culture ==
Sitzman was portrayed by Lynne Rostochil in Oliver Stone's 1991 film JFK and by Bitsie Tulloch in Peter Landesman's 2013 film Parkland.
