= Jean Hill =

Eyewitness to President John F. Kennedy's assassination

- Jean Hill in 1963, as photographed by Dallas Times Herald and United Press International photographer Darryl Heikes
- Born: Norma Jean Lollis; February 11, 1931; Ferguson, Oklahoma, U.S.
- Died: November 7, 2000 (aged 69); Dallas, Texas, U.S.
- Resting place: Grove Hill Memorial Park
- Other name: Lady In Red
- Education: Wewoka High School
- Alma mater: Oklahoma Baptist University
- Occupation: Teacher
- Known for: Witness to assassination of John F. Kennedy
- Spouse: Bill Hill (m. 1951; div. 1964)
- Children: 2

Norma Jean Lollis Hill (February 11, 1931 – November 7, 2000) was an American woman who was an eyewitness to the assassination of United States President John F. Kennedy in Dallas, Texas, on November 22, 1963. Hill was known as the "Lady in Red" because of the long red raincoat she wore that day, as seen in Abraham Zapruder's film of the assassination. A teacher by profession, she was a consultant for Oliver Stone's 1991 film JFK and co-wrote JFK: The Last Dissenting Witness with Bill Sloan.

Hill was a consistent critic of the official report of the Warren Commission since its release and in 1992 she co-wrote a book entitled The Last Dissenting Witness. In this book she made the assertion that her reported testimony before the Warren Commission was fabricated by the commission, a claim also made by others about Warren Commission testimony.

== Background and early life ==
Hill was born and raised in Ferguson, Oklahoma. After her parents divorced in 1943, she moved with her father to Wewoka, Oklahoma where she later graduated from Wewoka High School. Upon graduation, Hill enrolled at Oklahoma Baptist University. She dropped out after two years after marrying Bill Hill. The couple had two children, Jeanne and Billy. Hill eventually returned to college and earned a degree in elementary education in 1955. Hill worked as a teacher in Oklahoma City until 1962 when the family moved to Dallas for Bill Hill's job at Science Research Associates.

Shortly after moving to Dallas, Hill and her husband separated. To support herself and her children, Hill got a job as a teacher with the Dallas public school system. Jean and Bill Hill's divorce was finalized in August 1964.

== Eyewitness to the assassination of John F. Kennedy ==
Jean Hill (left) and Mary Moorman (right) as captured in Frame 298 of the Zapruder film, less than one second before the fatal head shot.

Hill and Moorman as photographed on the day of the assassination.

Hill was present along with her friend Mary Moorman across from the grassy knoll, and was one of the very nearest witnesses to the presidential limousine when shots were fired at President Kennedy. Moorman can be seen in the Zapruder film taking pictures, which Hill stated were later taken and bleached out by unknown parties. At Zapruder frame 313, when Kennedy was shot in the head, Hill was only 21 feet (6.4 m) away, leftward, and slightly behind him. In her Warren Commission testimony, she stated that a Secret Service agent told her right after the attack that another Secret Service agent, watching from the courthouse, saw a bullet strike "at my feet" and kick up debris. Hill was also one of several witnesses who stated that at the end of the assassination they saw smoke lingering near the grassy knoll picket fence corner.

Hill told the Warren Commission that she thought the shots were coming from the direction of the grassy knoll.

She further said that after the assassination she watched a man running from near the Texas School Book Depository toward the picket fence area. After watching this man, Hill crossed the street and was one of many witnesses and authorities who first ran toward the grassy knoll after the shots ended.

Mrs. Jean L. Hill stated that after the firing stopped she saw a white man wearing a brown overcoat and a hat running west away from the Depository Building in the direction of the railroad tracks. She has since stated when she saw a photo of Jack Ruby after his killing of Lee Harvey Oswald she now believes he was the man she saw running. You can see in the Zapruder film that she was clearly looking into the direction of the Texas School Book Depository while the president is right in front of her which appears to support her story of looking at someone running just after the assassination. There are no other witnesses who claim to have seen a man running toward the railroad tracks. Examination of all the available films of the area following the shooting, reexamination of the interviews with individuals in the vicinity of the shooting, and the interviews with members of the Dallas police department and the Dallas Country sheriff's office failed to corroborate Mrs. Hill's recollection or to reveal the identity of the man described by Mrs. Hill.

Hill stated that she received death threats and that the brake lines of her automobile were cut after the assassination. She viewed herself as a survivor who had escaped the "mysterious deaths" purported to have befallen other witnesses to the assassination.

In her 2004 book Conspiracy Narratives in Roman History, Victoria Emma Pagán, a professor of classics at the University of Florida, compared Hill to Hispala Faecenia stating that each had knowledge of a vast conspiracy, were allegedly threatened with physical harm if they did not support the official versions, and were allegedly deemed unreliable by authorities "by virtue of their low social status". Pagán wrote that Hill kept silent for 15 years due to "'accidents' that befell other witnesses" and eventually defied the official report due to "strong patriotic convictions". Gary Mack, curator of the Sixth Floor Museum at Dealey Plaza, said changes in Hill's story over time led some researchers of the Kennedy assassination to consider Hill a "controversial witness".

== Later life ==
Hill was reported to have avoided publicity for nearly 25 years after testifying to the Warren Commission. She continued working for the Dallas Public School System until her retirement a few years before her death.

Hill made an appearance in the 1988 Jack Anderson documentary American Expose: Who Killed JFK?. Later she worked as a consultant for Oliver Stone's 1991 film JFK, and was portrayed in the movie by Ellen McElduff. In 1992, Hill and Dallas journalist Bill Sloan released JFK: The Last Dissenting Witness. Stone wrote the foreword for the book. Publishers Weekly said The Last Dissenting Witness "was often engaging, sometimes infuriating" and that Hill's "story is salutary for those overly respectful of official authority." Hill spoke to various groups about her experience of the Kennedy assassination and its controversial aftermath during the last few years of her life. She was interviewed for the 1992 documentary Beyond 'JFK': The Question of Conspiracy.

== Death ==
On November 7, 2000, she died of complications due to a blood disease in Parkland Memorial Hospital in Dallas, the same hospital to which Kennedy was rushed after being fatally shot. Parkland Memorial Hospital is also where Kennedy's assassin Lee Harvey Oswald and Oswald's killer Jack Ruby died. Hill is buried in Grove Hill Memorial Park in Dallas.
