= Abraham Zapruder =

Witness to the John F. Kennedy assassination (1905–1970)

- Zapruder c. 1960
- Born: May 15, 1905; Kovel, Russian Empire (present-day Ukraine)
- Died: August 30, 1970 (aged 65); Dallas, Texas, U.S.
- Resting place: Emanu-El Cemetery
- Occupation: Dress manufacturer
- Known for: Filming a home movie of the assassination of U.S. President John F. Kennedy
- Spouse: Lillian Shapovnick (m. 1933)
- Children: 2

Abraham Zapruder (May 15, 1905 – August 30, 1970) was a Russian born American clothing manufacturer based in Dallas, Texas, who filmed the assassination of United States president John F. Kennedy in Dallas on November 22, 1963. Of Jewish descent, Zapruder resided in Dallas and founded a fashion company. On the day of the assassination, he captured the shooting in a home movie while filming Kennedy's presidential limousine as it traveled through Dealey Plaza. The Zapruder film is regarded as the most complete footage of the assassination. Zapruder died in 1970.

== Early life ==
Abraham Zapruder was born into a Jewish family in the city of Kovel, Russian Empire (present-day Ukraine), the son of Israel Zapruder. He received only four years of formal education in Ukraine. In 1909, his father left for North America. In 1918, Abraham Zapruder left Kovel for Warsaw with his family. In 1920, his family emigrated to the United States, settling in Brooklyn, New York City, where they were reunited with Israel Zapruder.

Studying English at night, he found work as a clothing pattern maker in Manhattan's garment district. In 1933, he married Lillian Sapovnik (1913–1993); they went on to have two children. Zapruder was a Freemason and an Inspector-General (33rd degree) of the Scottish Rite.

In 1941, Zapruder moved to Dallas, Texas, to work for Nardis, a local sportswear company. In 1949, he co-founded Jennifer Juniors, Inc., producing the Chalet and Jennifer Juniors brands of dresses. (Note: Towards the end of June 1959 until 1973, Jeanne LeGon was the fourth wife of George S. De Mohrenschildt. She worked at Nardis from summer 1953 until April 1954 (which is after Zapruder left). From the summer of 1962 and prior to their leaving for Haiti in June 1963, Jeanne and George De Mohrenschildt befriended an immigrant from the Soviet Union, Marina Oswald and her husband Lee Harvey Oswald. George De Mohrenschildt said that there were only 25 or 30 families in the Dallas-Fort Worth area from either Russia or the Soviet Union in the early 1960s and that these families were close.) His Jennifer Juniors offices were on the fourth floor of the Dal-Tex Building, across the street from the Texas School Book Depository.

== Witness to Kennedy assassination ==
=== Filming of assassination ===
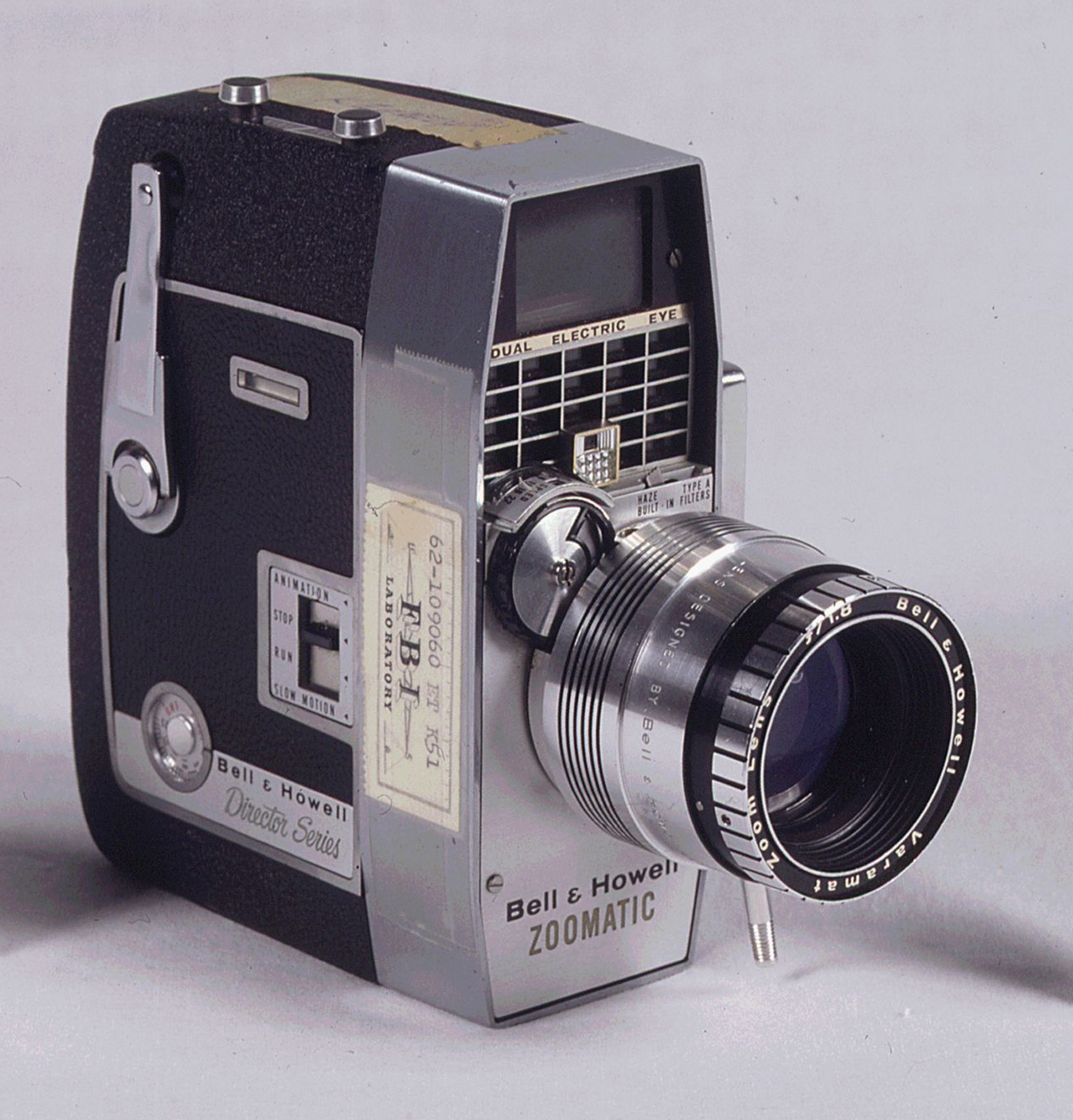
Abraham Zapruder's camera, in the collection of the US National Archives

Zapruder was an admirer of President Kennedy, and a Democrat. Zapruder's daughter, Myrna, had gone to Dallas Love Field that morning to see Kennedy and the First Lady upon their arrival. His son-in-law, Myron, was positioned on Main Street to watch the motorcade go by. Zapruder had originally planned to film the motorcade carrying Kennedy through downtown Dallas on November 22, but he decided not to because it had been raining that morning. When he arrived at work that morning without his camera, Zapruder's assistant Lillian Rogers insisted that he retrieve it from home before going to Dealey Plaza because the weather had cleared.

Zapruder's movie camera was an 8 mm Bell & Howell Zoomatic Director Series Model 414 PD—top-of-the-line when it was purchased in 1962. Making films was one of Zapruder's favorite hobbies for over 30 years. Zapruder had planned to film the motorcade from his office window but opted for a better spot in Dealey Plaza where the motorcade would be passing. He stood atop a 4-foot (1.2 m) concrete abutment extending from the John Neely Bryan concrete pergola on the grassy knoll north of Elm Street on the opposite side of the Texas School Book Depository to the north in Dealey Plaza. Zapruder's secretary, Marilyn Sitzman, offered to assist Zapruder as he had vertigo and was apprehensive about standing even at a small height of a few feet alone.

While Sitzman stood behind Zapruder and held his coat to steady him, he began shooting the presidential motorcade as it turned from Houston Street onto Elm Street in front of the Book Depository. Zapruder's film captured 26.6 seconds of the traveling motorcade carrying Kennedy on 486 frames of Kodak Kodachrome II safety film. It captured the fatal headshot that struck Kennedy as his limousine passed almost directly in front of Zapruder and Sitzman's position, 65 feet (20 m) from the center of Elm Street.

Zapruder later recalled that he immediately knew that Kennedy's wounds were fatal as he saw the president's head "...explode like a firecracker." and that he shouted repeatedly "They've killed him!" Walking back to his office amid the confusion following the shots, Zapruder encountered The Dallas Morning News reporter Harry McCormick, who had been standing near Zapruder and had noticed he was filming the motorcade. McCormick was acquainted with Agent Forrest Sorrels of the Secret Service's Dallas office, and offered to bring Sorrels to Zapruder's office. Zapruder agreed and returned to his office. McCormick later found Sorrels outside the Sheriff's office at Main and Houston, and together they went to Zapruder's office.

Zapruder agreed to give the film to Sorrels on the condition it would be used only for investigation of the assassination. The three then took the film to the television station WFAA intending to have it developed. After it was realized that WFAA was unable to do so, the film was taken to Eastman Kodak's Dallas processing plant later that afternoon, where it was developed around 6:30 p.m. As the Kodachrome process requires different equipment for duplication than development, the original print was taken to the Jamieson Film Company, where three additional copies were made; these were returned to Kodak around 8 p.m. for processing. Zapruder kept the original, plus one copy, and gave the other two copies to Sorrels, who sent them to Secret Service headquarters in Washington.

=== Television interview ===
While at WFAA, Zapruder described Kennedy's assassination on live television:

Jay Watson (WFAA, Dallas)

[...] May I have your name, please, sir?
Abraham Zapruder
My name is Abraham Zapruder.
Watson
Mister, ZAP-puh-dah?
Zapruder
ZAP-pru-der, yes, sir.
Watson
ZAP-pru-dah. And would you tell us your story, please, sir?
Zapruder
I got out in, uh, about a half-hour earlier to get a good spot to shoot some pictures. And I found a spot—one of these concrete blocks they have down near that park, near the underpass. And I got on top there; there was another girl from my office; she was right behind me. And as I was shooting—as the President was coming down from Houston Street making his turn; it was about a half-way down there—I heard a shot, and he slumped to the side, like this. Then I heard another shot or two—I couldn't say [whether] it was one or two—and I saw his head practically open up [places fingers of right hand to right side of head in a narrow cone, over his right ear], all blood and everything, and I kept on shooting. That's about all. I'm just sick. I can't...
Watson
I think that pretty well expresses the entire feelings of the whole world.
Zapruder
Terrible, terrible.
Watson
You have the film in your camera; we'll try to get...
Zapruder
Yes, I brought it on the studio, now.
Watson
We'll try to get that processed and have it as soon as possible.

=== Sale of rights ===
Late that evening, Zapruder was contacted at home by Richard Stolley, an editor at Life magazine (and first editor of the future People magazine). They arranged to meet the following morning to view the film, after which Zapruder sold the print rights to Life for $50,000. Stolley was representing Time/Life on behalf of publisher Charles Douglas Jackson.

The following day (November 24), Life purchased all rights to the film for a total of $150,000 (approximately $1,577,000 today).

The night after the assassination, Zapruder said that he had a nightmare in which he saw a booth in Times Square advertising "See the President's head explode!" He determined that, while he was willing to make money from the film, he did not want the public to see the full horror of what he had seen. Therefore, a condition of the sale to Life was that frame 313, showing the fatal shot, would be withheld from the public. Although he made a profit from selling the film, he asked that the amount he was paid not be publicly disclosed. He later donated $25,000 (about $263,000 today) of the money he was paid to the widow of Dallas police officer J. D. Tippit, who was shot dead less than an hour after Kennedy was shot.

Zapruder testified to the Warren Commission and was asked for his impression regarding the direction of the shots by assistant Commission counsel Wesley Liebeler:

LIEBELER: Did you form any opinion about the direction from which the shots came by the sound, or were you just upset by the thing you had seen?
ZAPRUDER: No, there was too much reverberation. There was an echo which gave me a sound all over. In other words that square is kind of—it had a sound all over.

Zapruder added that while he did not recollect a belief on the directions of the shots, he had assumed an impression when "I saw motorcycle policemen running right behind me—I guess they thought it came from right behind me...I also thought it came from in back of me."

Zapruder recalled the assassination, saying that when he saw the president react to his throat wound, he thought that the president was joking until he saw him shot in the head, whereupon he broke down and wept. At the end of his testimony, he stated, "I am ashamed of myself. I didn’t know I was going to break down and for a man to—but it was a tragic thing, and when you started asking me that, and I saw the thing all over again, and it was an awful thing—I know very few people who had seen it like that—it was an awful thing and I loved the President, and to see that happen before my eyes—his head just opened up and shot down like a dog—it leaves a very, very deep sentimental impression with you; it’s terrible." He broke down again when he testified in 1969 for the trial of Clay Shaw.

Zapruder rejected conspiracy theorists' claims as "sensational literature" and supported the Warren Commission's conclusion (that Lee Harvey Oswald, acting alone, killed Kennedy). He never filmed with a camera again following the assassination.

== Death ==
Zapruder died of stomach cancer at the age of 65 in Dallas on August 30, 1970, at Parkland Memorial Hospital, the same hospital where Kennedy, Oswald and Jack Ruby, who shot Oswald, died; he was buried in the Emanu-El Cemetery in Dallas.

== Media and legacy ==
In 1975, Time, Inc. (which owned Life magazine) sold the film back to the Zapruder family for $1. In 1978, the Zapruders allowed the film to be stored at the National Archives and Records Administration where it remains. In 1999, the Zapruders donated the copyright of the film to the Sixth Floor Museum at Dealey Plaza.

Media personality Andrew Denton founded a production company named after Zapruder called "Zapruder's Other Films".

Zapruder was the subject of a 1993 BBC special.

Zapruder has been portrayed by:

- Ray LePere (1991) – JFK
- Andrew Dunn (2002) – Timequest (2002), a time-travel film;
- Paul Giamatti (2013) – Parkland
- Ira Einsohn – 11.22.63 (2016)

His granddaughter Alexandra Zapruder wrote the 2016 book Twenty-Six Seconds: A Personal History of the Zapruder Film, detailing Zapruder's life.
