= James Tague =

Witness to the JFK assassination (1936–2014)

- Born: James Thomas Tague; October 17, 1936; Plainfield, Indiana, U.S.
- Died: February 28, 2014 (aged 77); Bonham, Texas, U.S.
- Education: United States Air Force School of Aerospace Medicine
- Occupation: Car salesman
- Known for: Witness of John F. Kennedy's assassination

James Thomas Tague (October 17, 1936 – February 28, 2014) was an American car salesman who received minor injuries during the assassination of United States President John F. Kennedy in Dallas, Texas, on November 22, 1963. Tague received a minor cut to his right cheek caused by tiny pieces of concrete debris from a street curb that was struck by fragments from a bullet that was fired at Kennedy. Aside from Kennedy and Texas Governor John Connally, Tague was the only other person known to have been wounded as a result of gunfire in Dealey Plaza that day.

== Life ==
Tague was born on a farm near Plainfield, Indiana. He dropped out of Purdue University to join the United States Air Force. He graduated from the United States Air Force School of Aerospace Medicine and became a car salesman in Dallas, Texas.

== Kennedy assassination ==
Tague had been driving to Downtown Dallas to have lunch with his girlfriend, and future wife, when he came upon a traffic jam caused by the presidential motorcade that was traveling west on Elm Street. Tague testified to the Warren Commission that because of the traffic, he parked his car on the north curb of Commerce Street, where he then "got out of his car and stood by the bridge abutment." Tague was a few feet north of the southern edge of the triple underpass railroad bridge when he saw the presidential limousine and heard the first shot.

As with many other witnesses, Tague remembered hearing this first shot and likened it to a firecracker. He later testified that the first shot he recalled hearing had occurred after the presidential limousine had already completed the 120-degree slow turn from Houston Street onto Elm Street and then straightened out. The motorcade then proceeded in his direction down Elm Street, parallel to Commerce Street.

Soon after the shots were fired, Tague was approached by Dallas Detective Buddy Walthers, who noticed specks of blood on Tague's right cheek. The detective asked Tague where he had been standing. The two men then examined the area and discovered, on the upper, curved part of Main Street south curb, a "very fresh scar" impact that they believed indicated that a bullet had struck there and had taken a small chip out of the curb's concrete. They came to the conclusion that one bullet had ricocheted off the curb and the debris then hit Tague.

The curb surrounding the scar chip was not cut out until August 1964, after Tague had repeatedly reminded authorities of also being wounded during the shots, and it is now in the National Archives. The scar chip was 23 feet 6 inches (7.16 m) north of the south edge of the triple underpass railroad bridge, about 20 feet (6 m) from where Tague stood during the attack. The detective told Tague that it appeared that a bullet had been fired from either the Texas School Book Depository or the Dal-Tex Building.

== After assassination ==
=== Warren Commission and FBI ===
Tague was called by the Warren Commission to testify on July 23, 1964. He told the commission that his impression at the time was that somebody was throwing firecrackers from behind the pergola on the grassy knoll.

According to the Warren Commission's final report, forensic tests by the FBI revealed that the chipped bullet mark impact location contained no embedded copper metal residue, which indicated that it was not created by "an unmutilated military full metal-jacketed bullet such as the bullet from Governor Connally's stretcher." In Tague's Truth Withheld, he published pictures of the wound that were taken on November 23, 1963.

=== Books and events ===
He was interviewed for the 1967 Mark Lane documentary Rush to Judgment. In 1988 he made an appearance in the documentary The Men Who Killed Kennedy. In the 1991 film JFK he is portrayed by Michael Skipper.

In 2003, forty years after the assassination, Tague published a book called Truth Withheld (ISBN 0-9718254-7-5), detailing his experiences during and after the assassination. He wrote that he was injured after the second shot.

In 2011, Tague revisited the scene of his injury for the researcher Max Holland's investigation into the first shot for the documentary JFK: The Lost Bullet.

In 2013, Tague published his second book, LBJ and the Kennedy Killing (ISBN 1937584747), which claimed that Vice President Lyndon B. Johnson and his associates were involved in the assassination.

== Later life and death ==
Tague became a car salesman in Bonham, Texas, where he retired. He died there on February 28, 2014, at the age of 77.

== See also ==
- Single-bullet theory

== Authored works ==
- Truth Withheld: A Survivors Story - Why We Will Never Know the Truth About the JFK Assassination. Excel Digital Pr Inc. 2003. ISBN 9780971825475.
- LBJ and the Kennedy Killing. Trine Day. 2013. ISBN 9781937584740.
