= Orville Nix =

Witness to the JFK assassination

- Born: Orville Orhel Nix; April 16, 1911
- Died: January 17, 1972 (aged 60); Dallas, Texas, U.S.
- Resting place: Edgewood Cemetery
- Spouse: Ella Louise Robison (m. 1938–1972) (his death)
- Children: 1

Orville Orhel Nix (April 16, 1911 – January 17, 1972) was a witness to the assassination of United States President John F. Kennedy in Dallas, Texas on November 22, 1963. His filming of the shooting, which only captured the last few seconds of it, but shows the grassy knoll in its entirety, is considered to be nearly as important as the film by Abraham Zapruder.

== Background ==
Nix was born in Texas, the son of Myrtle (née Mabra) and James Allan Nix. He was reported to have had a fourth grade education and later worked as an air conditioning engineer for the General Services Administration in Dallas. He was married to Ella Louise Robison in 1938 with whom he had one son, Orville Jr.

== JFK assassination ==
On November 22, 1963, Nix walked from his office in the Terminal Annex building on the south side of Dealey Plaza to the northwest corner of the intersection of Main Street and Houston Street with his Keystone Auto-Zoom Model K-810 8 mm movie camera. Nix filmed the presidential limousine and motorcade as it entered the Plaza, then quickly moved 20 to 60 feet (6.1 to 18.3 m) west of Houston Street to the south curb of Main Street. There, he ended up capturing the last part of the assassination with the grassy knoll in the background. Shortly after the motorcade had left Dealey Plaza, he filmed people running from Main Street to Elm Street.

Nix's film is much darker than the other films shot that day, as he used Type A film, specifically designed for indoor use, and did not have the proper filter to correct this.

The Nix film was obtained as a result of a notice that the FBI gave to film processing plants in the Dallas area, that the FBI would be interested in obtaining or knowing about any film they processed relating to the assassination. When Nix heard about this from his processor, he delivered the film to the FBI office in Dallas on December 1, 1963. It was returned to him three days later.

United Press International (UPI) purchased the copyright for $5,000 and took possession of the original copy of Nix’s film on December 6, 1963. Reese Schonfeld, a UPI executive and later the founding president of CNN, stewarded the film for UPI. UPI distributed frame enlargements to its news subscribers the following day. The film’s original rendition was examined by the House Select Committee on Assassinations in 1978. When UPI returned the copyright and all its copies to the Nix family in 1992, the film’s original version was missing. In 2002, the Nix family assigned the film’s copyright to the Dallas County Historical Foundation, which operates the Sixth Floor Museum at Dealey Plaza. Portions of the film were utilised by the 1991 film JFK.

Nix was interviewed in 1966 by investigator Mark Lane for his documentary Rush to Judgment. In a filmed interview undertaken by Lane, he also stated that the film he received may not have been identical to the one that he shot. He told Lane that at the time of the assassination, he believed that the shots had come from behind the stockade fence on the grassy knoll, but was later told that conclusive proof existed that shots only came from the Texas School Book Depository and that he was convinced by this. He was also interviewed by CBS News in 1967 for a television documentary on the Kennedy assassination.

In 2015, Nix's granddaughter, Gayle Nix-Jackson, initiated a lawsuit against the US government for the return of the original film or compensation seeking $10 million. Nix-Jackson said that "it was incomprehensible authorities would lose an important piece of historical evidence. I can understand little clerical issues. I don't understand the loss of evidence like this." In 2017, Nix-Jackson's lawsuit was dismissed without prejudice.

== Death ==
On January 17, 1972, Nix died from a heart attack in Dallas at the age of 60. He is buried in Edgewood Cemetery in Lancaster, Texas.
