= Victoria Emma Pagán =

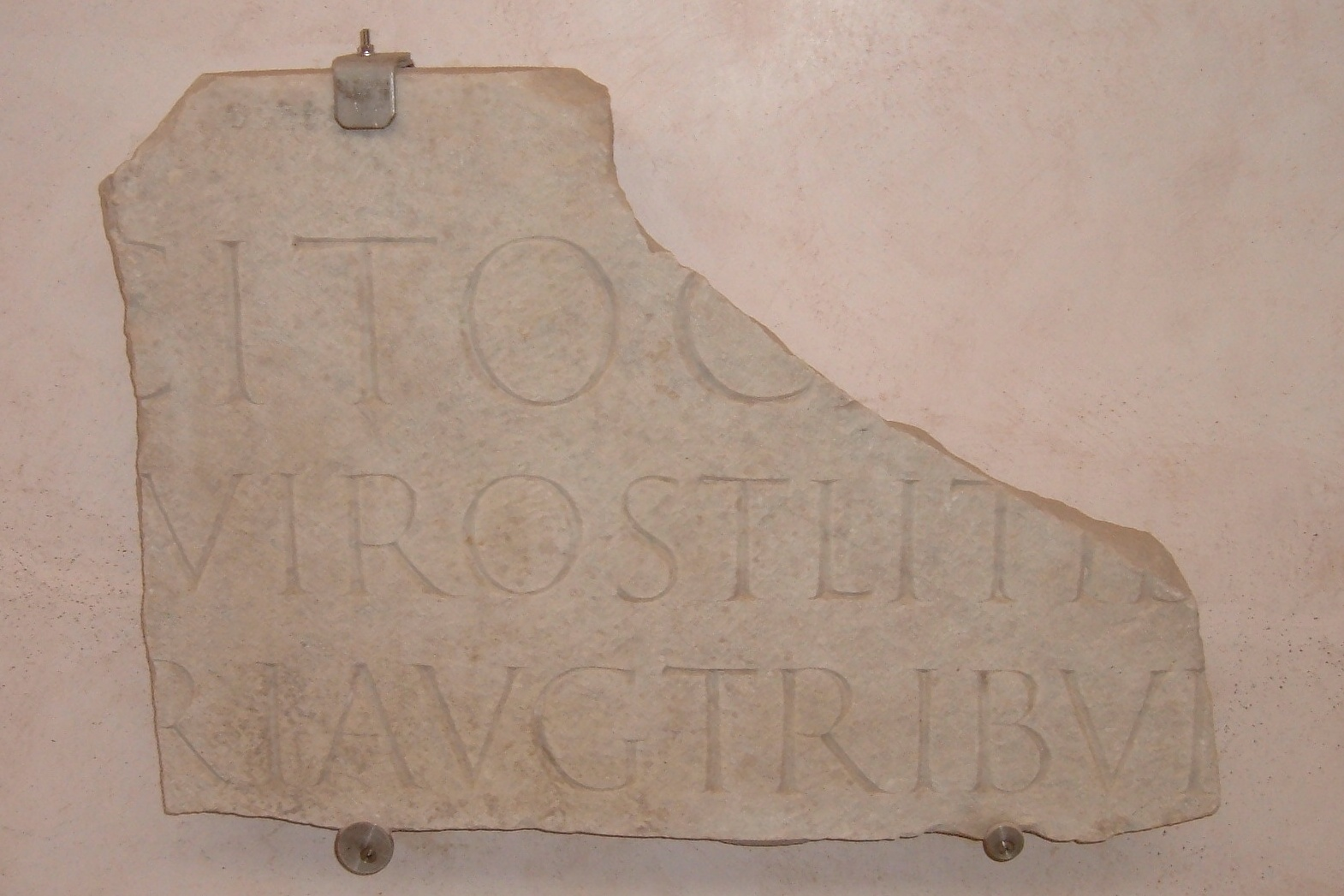
The possible inscription on the tomb of the historian Cornelius Tacitus, National Roman Museum, Baths of Diocletian, Rome

Victoria Emma Pagán is distinguished professor of classics at the University of Florida and president-elect of the Society for Classical Studies. Her research is on Roman historiography and literature, gardens, and conspiracy.

== Education ==
Pagán was awarded her PhD from the University of Chicago in 1997. Her doctoral thesis was titled Tacitus Plus: The Poetics of Disguise.

== Career and research ==
Pagán's research has focused on Roman historiography, especially the Roman historian Cornelius Tacitus. Pagán published the volume Disciples of Flora: Gardens in History and Culture with Judith W. Page, Professor of English, and Brigitte Weltman-Aron, Associate Professor of French, at the University of Florida. Her published research has been reviewed as 'critically nuanced' and 'formative', and 'thoughtful and innovative'.

In 2025, Pagán won the University of Florida's 2024-2025 Teacher/Scholar of the Year award and also won the Society for Classical Studies summer elections, where she will serve as president in the 2026 term.

== Bibliography ==
- Conspiracy Narratives in Roman History (University of Texas Press, 2004)
- Conspiracy Theory in Latin Literature (University of Texas Press, 2012)
- Rome and the Literature of Gardens (Bloomsbury, 2006)
- A Sallust Reader (Bolchazy-Carducci, 2009)
- (ed. with Judith W. Page and Brigitte Weltman-Aron) Disciples of Flora: Gardens in History and Culture (Cambridge Scholars Publishing, 2015)
- Tacitus (Bloomsbury, 2017)
- (ed.) Blackwell Companion to Tacitus (Blackwell, 2012)
- (ed. with James McNamara) Tacitus’ Wonders: Empire and Paradox in Ancient Rome (Bloomsbury, 2022)
- (ed.) Tacitus Encyclopedia (Wiley-Blackwell, 2023)
- (ed. with Judith W. Page) Women and the Collaborative Art of Gardens: From Antiquity to the Present (Routledge, 2023)
