= Sixth Floor Museum at Dealey Plaza =

Museum dedicated to John F. Kennedy in Dallas, Texas, U.S.

Sixth Floor Museum

- Exterior of the Dallas County Administration Building in 2015
- Established: February 20, 1989; 37 years ago
- Location: Dealey Plaza, Dallas, Texas, U.S. (411 Elm Street Dallas, TX 75202)
- Coordinates: 32°46′47″N 96°48′30″W
- Type: Historic
- Visitors: 400,000
- Director: Nicola Longford
- Curator: Stephen Fagin
- Public transit access: DART 11,12,19,21,35,60,63,81/82,161,164, 283
- Website: www.jfk.org

The Sixth Floor Museum at Dealey Plaza is a museum located on the sixth floor of the Dallas County Administration Building, formerly the Texas School Book Depository, in downtown Dallas, Texas, overlooking Dealey Plaza at the intersection of Elm and Houston Streets. The museum examines the life and times of United States President John F. Kennedy, as well as his assassination, and legacy, and the life of Lee Harvey Oswald, as well as the various conspiracy theories surrounding the assassination.

== Background ==
The seven-story building commonly known as Texas School Book Depository building, was originally built in 1901 on the foundation of an 1898 five-story structure which had burned down after being struck by lightning. Between 1901 and 1963, the building served first as a warehouse for plows and other agricultural equipment and then housed a grocery wholesaler. In 1963, the building was leased to the Texas School Book Depository Company and served as a distribution hub for school textbooks with regional offices for education publishers.

== Museum history ==
=== Creation ===
After the assassination, the building remained leased to the company until 1970. Then, after much community discussion, Dallas County acquired the building and undertook a major restoration project. Finished in 1981, the exterior of the building was restored to its 1901 appearance and the first five floors were used for administrative and government functions. During this time, the top two floors, including the infamous sixth floor, remained empty.

After a decade of development and community soul-searching, the museum opened on Presidents' Day, February 20, 1989. The Sixth Floor Exhibit opened as a response to the many visitors who come to Dealey Plaza to learn more about the assassination. The museum was founded by the Dallas County Historical Foundation.

The museum's primary exhibit, John F. Kennedy and the Memory of a Nation, provides historical context for the events of November 22, 1963, and the aftermath of the assassination. The exhibit uses historic films, photographs, artifacts, and interpretive displays to document the events of the assassination, the reports by government investigations that followed, and the historical legacy of the tragedy. The museum is self-sufficient in funding, relying solely on donations and ticket sales. It rents the space from the County of Dallas.

=== Holdings ===
Over the years, the museum has offered exhibits, access to a catalog of some 2,500 oral history recordings and speaker events with book authors and other prominent figures related to JFK, Oswald and the historic and cultural significance of the infamous presidential visit. The Museum’s collections include more than 90,000 items related to the assassination of President Kennedy and its local and global aftermath, the legacy of the Kennedy presidency, and the turbulent culture of the 1960s.

In December 1999, the Zapruder family donated the copyright to the Zapruder film to the Sixth Floor Museum, along with one of the first-generation copies made on November 22, 1963, and other copies of the film. The Zapruder family no longer retains any copyrights to the film, which are now controlled entirely by the museum. The original camera negative is in the possession of the National Archives and Records Administration.

In 2002, the family of Orville Nix, who filmed the last few seconds of the assassination, assigned the film’s copyright to the Dallas County Historical Foundation, which operates the Sixth Floor Museum. In 2015, Nix's granddaughter, Gayle Nix-Jackson, sued the Sixth Floor Museum for the return of the original film or compensation seeking $10 million. Nix-Jackson said that "it was incomprehensible authorities would lose an important piece of historical evidence. I can understand little clerical issues. I don't understand the loss of evidence like this." In 2017, Nix-Jackson's lawsuit was dismissed without prejudice. In 2024, it was overturned in a Federal Claims court.

In February 2007, the previously unreleased 8 mm film footage of Kennedy's motorcade, donated to the museum by George Jefferies and his son-in-law, was shown publicly for the first time. The 40-second film, silent and in color, showed the motorcade before the assassination, as well as part of Dealey Plaza the following day. The Jefferies film was described as capturing "a beaming Jacqueline Kennedy," as well as showing Kennedy's suit jacket bunched-up in the back at that moment, about two minutes before Kennedy entered Dealey Plaza.

The Sixth Floor Museum also aroused controversy when it described the Casons (Jack was president of the TSBD in 1963) as "a conservative family, feared for President Kennedy's safety during his visit to Dallas". It was noted by others that a document detailed that in 1961, wife Gladys Cason, when drunk, told dinner guests that "someone should shoot President Kennedy".

=== Activities ===
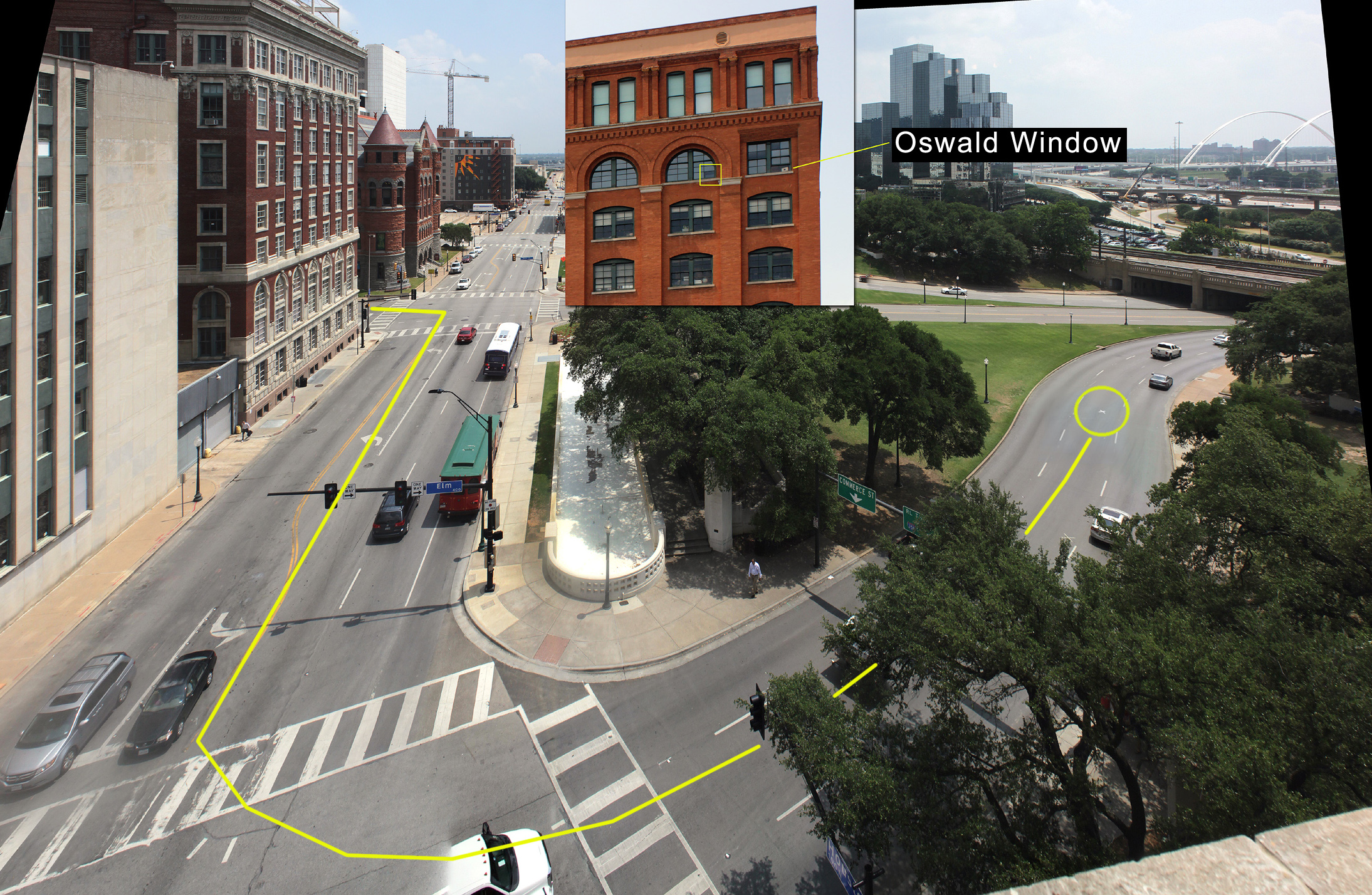
This is a view from the next window over from the sixth floor shooting position. The yellow line shows the route of Kennedy's motorcade. There is an 'x' on the road marking the location at which the fatal shot struck Kennedy.

A museum webcam features a live view from the sixth floor sniper's nest.

For the 60th anniversary in November 2023, the museum offered some timely speaker programs. Its "JFK Was Here" banners to highlight the historical significance of places along the 1963 motorcade route from Love Field to Dealey Plaza were met with mixed reactions about reminders of the assassination.

The Sixth Floor Museum neither encourages nor discourages the idea of conspiracy theories.

=== Curators ===
The first curator of the Sixth Floor Museum was Gary Mack (born Larry Dunkel, 1946 - 2015), who served from 2000 to 2015. Consumed with what happened in Dealey Plaza, Mack started out chasing conspiracy theories and ended up chief historian and archivist of the assassination. He partially discredited some conspiracy theories, and supported the official conclusion that Oswald acted alone. Mack died in 2015 aged 68 from an aggressive cancer.

Stephen Fagin is the current curator of the Sixth Floor Museum. Fagin manages the institution's ongoing Oral History Project and contributes to collections, exhibitions, education, and public programming initiatives. He is the author of Assassination and Commemoration: JFK, Dallas, and The Sixth Floor Museum at Dealey Plaza, published by the University of Oklahoma Press in 2013.
