= John Neely Bryan =

American lawyer (1810–1877)

- Born: John Neely Bryan; December 24, 1810; Fayetteville, Tennessee, U.S.
- Died: September 8, 1877 (aged 66); Austin State Hospital, Texas, U.S.
- Occupations: farmer lawyer tradesman
- Known for: Founder of Dallas, Texas, United States

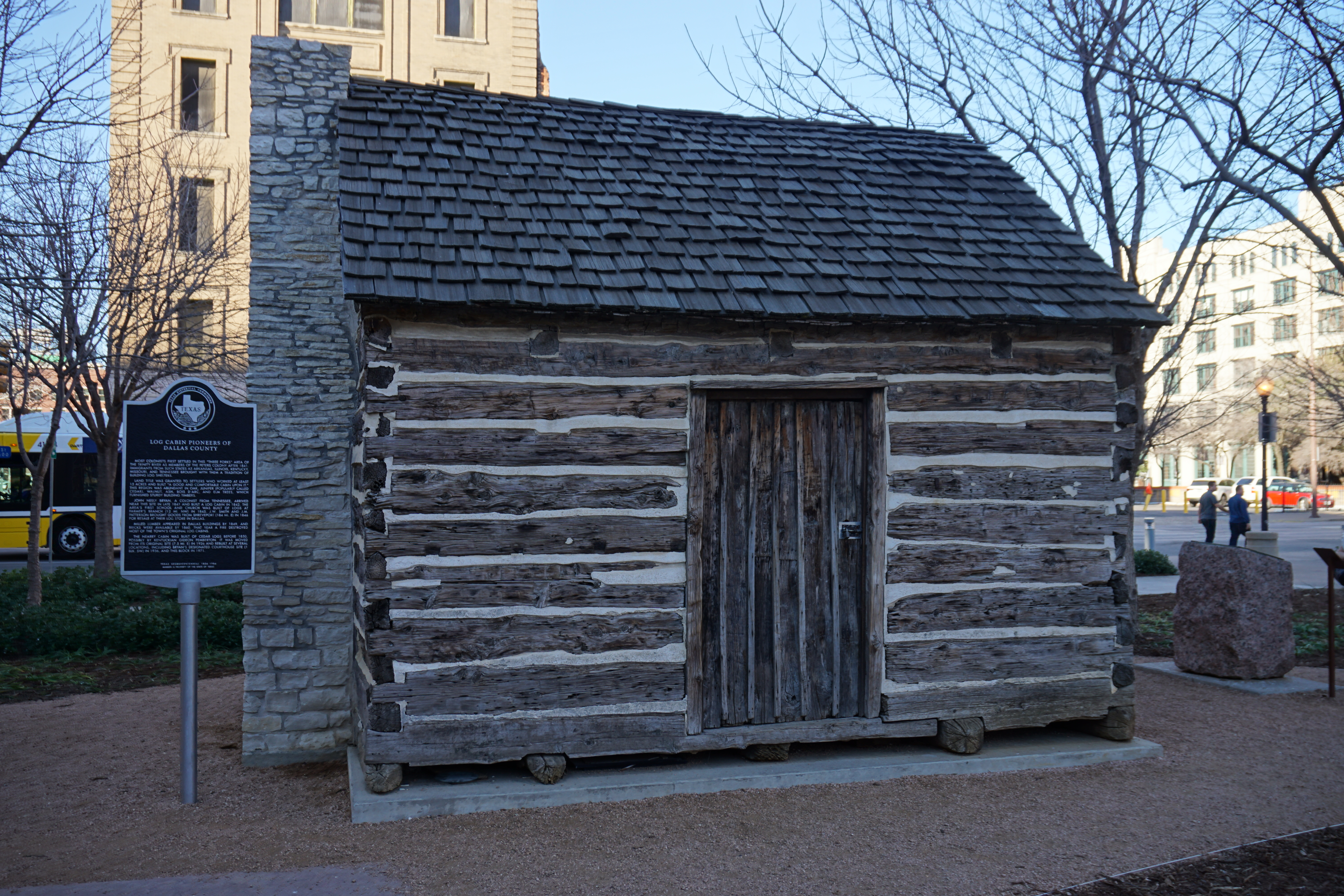
Replica of John Neely Bryan's cabin, Founders Plaza, Dallas, Texas.

John Neely Bryan (December 24, 1810 – September 8, 1877) was a Presbyterian farmer, lawyer, and tradesman in the United States and founder of the city of Dallas, Texas.

== Early life ==
Bryan was born to James and Elizabeth (Neely) Bryan in Fayetteville, Tennessee. There, he attended the Fayetteville Military Academy and, after studying law, was admitted to the Tennessee Bar. Around 1833, he left Tennessee and moved to Arkansas, where he was an Indian trader. According to some sources, he and a business partner laid out Van Buren, Arkansas.

== Exploring Dallas ==
Bryan visited the Dallas area in 1839, and in 1841, he established a permanent settlement, which eventually became the burgeoning city of Dallas.

== Establishment of Dallas ==
During the early years of the settlement, Bryan served as the postmaster, a store owner, a ferry operator (he operated a ferry where Commerce Street crosses the Trinity River today), and his home was used as the courthouse. In 1844, he persuaded J. P. Dumas to survey and plot the site of Dallas and possibly help him with the work. Bryan was instrumental in the organizing of Dallas County in 1846 and the election by voters of Dallas as its county seat in August 1850 (over the towns of Cedar Springs and Oak Cliff). When Dallas became the county seat, Bryan donated the land for the courthouse. In 1843, he married Margaret Beeman, a daughter of the Beeman family who settled in Dallas from Bird's Fort. The couple had five children. Another Beeman, John, arrived in Dallas in April 1842 and planted the first corn.

== Gold rush ==
In 1849, Bryan went to California during the gold rush but returned within a year. In January 1853, he was a delegate to the Texas State Democratic convention. In 1855, Bryan shot a man who had insulted his wife and fled to the Creek Nation. The man he shot made a full recovery, and Bryan certainly would've been informed, but still, Bryan did not return to Dallas for about six years. During that time, Bryan traveled to Colorado and California, probably looking for gold. He returned to Dallas in time for a brief military expedition against the Comanche Indians in 1860.

== Later life ==
Bryan joined Col. Nicholas H. Darnell's Eighteenth Texas Cavalry regiment in the winter of 1861 and served with the unit until late 1862, when he was discharged due to his old age and poor health. He returned to Dallas in 1862 and became actively involved in community affairs. In 1863, Bryan was a trustee for the Dallas Male and Female Academy. In 1866, during a Dallas flood, he was very prominent in aiding those affected. He also chaired a citizens' meeting that pushed the Houston and Texas Central Railway to complete the railway through the city and presided at a rally that sought to get full political rights for all ex-Confederates. In 1871 and 1872, Bryan became one of the directors of the Dallas Bridge Company, which built the first iron bridge across the Trinity River. He also stood on the platform at the welcoming ceremonies for the Houston and Texas Central Railway when the first train pulled into town in mid-July 1872.

== Death and burial ==
By 1874, Bryan's mind was impaired, though it is not known precisely how. "I am the son of John Neely Bryan, now before the court," Edward T. Bryan testified on February 1, 1877. "My father is insane." He was admitted to the Texas State Lunatic Asylum in February 1877 and died there on September 8, 1877. He is believed to be buried in an unmarked grave in the southeast quadrant of the Austin State Hospital Cemetery. In 2006, Bryan's descendants placed a headstone in the cemetery that reads "PVT 18 Texas CAV CSA Dec 24 1810 Sep 8 1877 Founder of Dallas Texas."

== Legacy ==
In 1954, the James Butler Bonham chapter of the Daughters of the Republic of Texas erected a white granite marker honoring the Dallas founder in Pioneer Park Cemetery.

A large marker bearing the name "Bryan" and displaying two "Citizen of the Republic of Texas" medallions honoring John Neely Bryan and his wife stands in Riverside Cemetery at Wichita Falls, Texas. It overlooks the graves of Margaret Beeman Bryan (1825-1919), her son John Neely Bryan, Jr. (1846-1926), and other family members.

A Texas Historical Marker, "Beeman Memorial Cemetery," located east of downtown Dallas just off of Dolphin Road, states that John Neely Bryan is buried in the Beeman family plot of his wife, Margaret, and other Beeman family members. This cemetery is somewhat difficult to locate, but is located just behind a large Jewish Cemetery (Shearith Israel) on Dolphin Road just south of Military Parkway.

The Bryan Colonnade, on the Grassy Knoll in Dealey Plaza, carries a 1978 Texas Historical Commission marker honoring Bryan and his wife. Abraham Zapruder was standing at the colonnade when he recorded the Zapruder film.

Dallas Independent School District named John Neely Bryan Elementary after him.

The Grassy Knoll and Bryan pergola in Dealey Plaza.

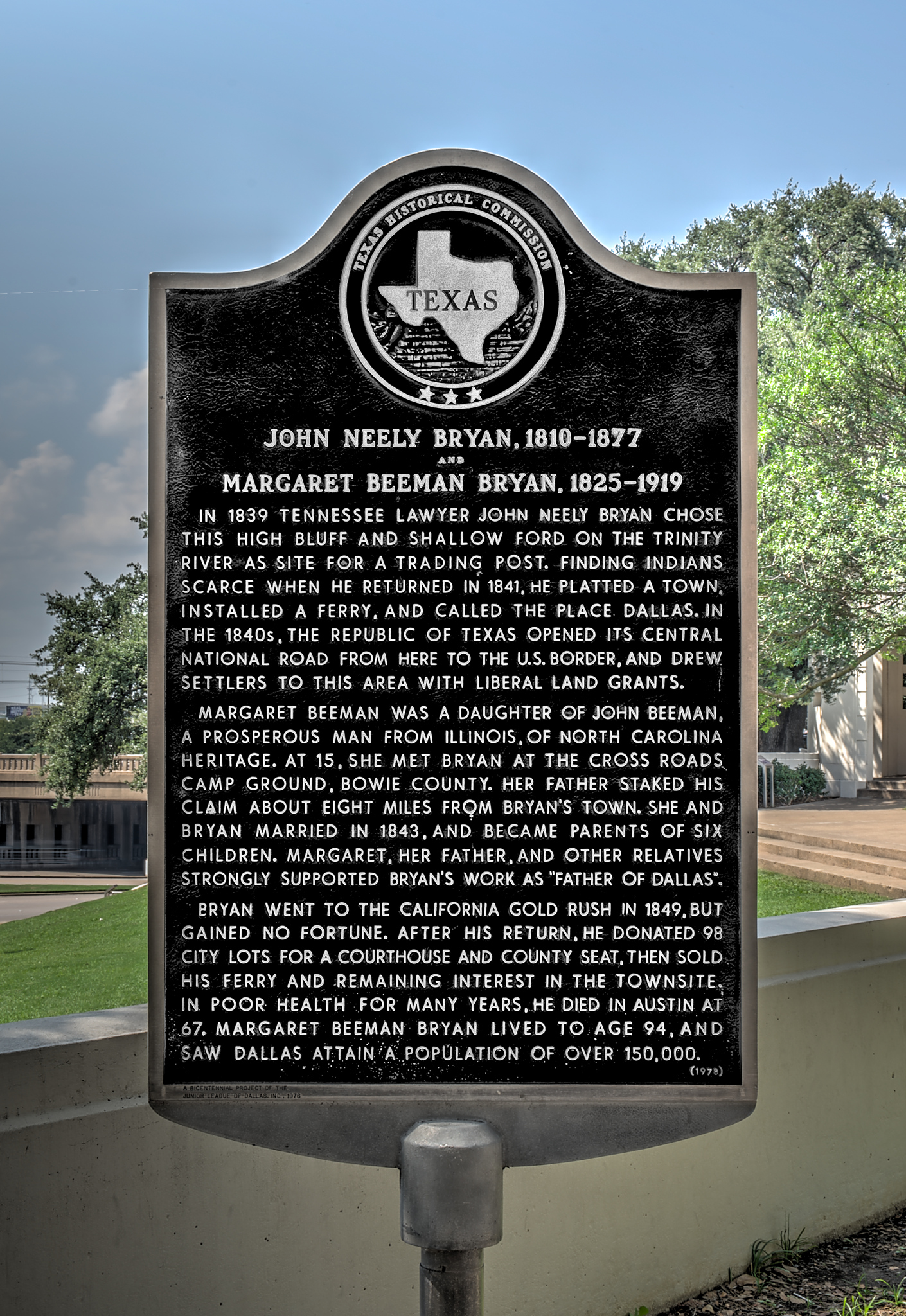
Historical Marker for Bryan
