= Dal-Tex Building =

Office building in Dallas, Texas, United States

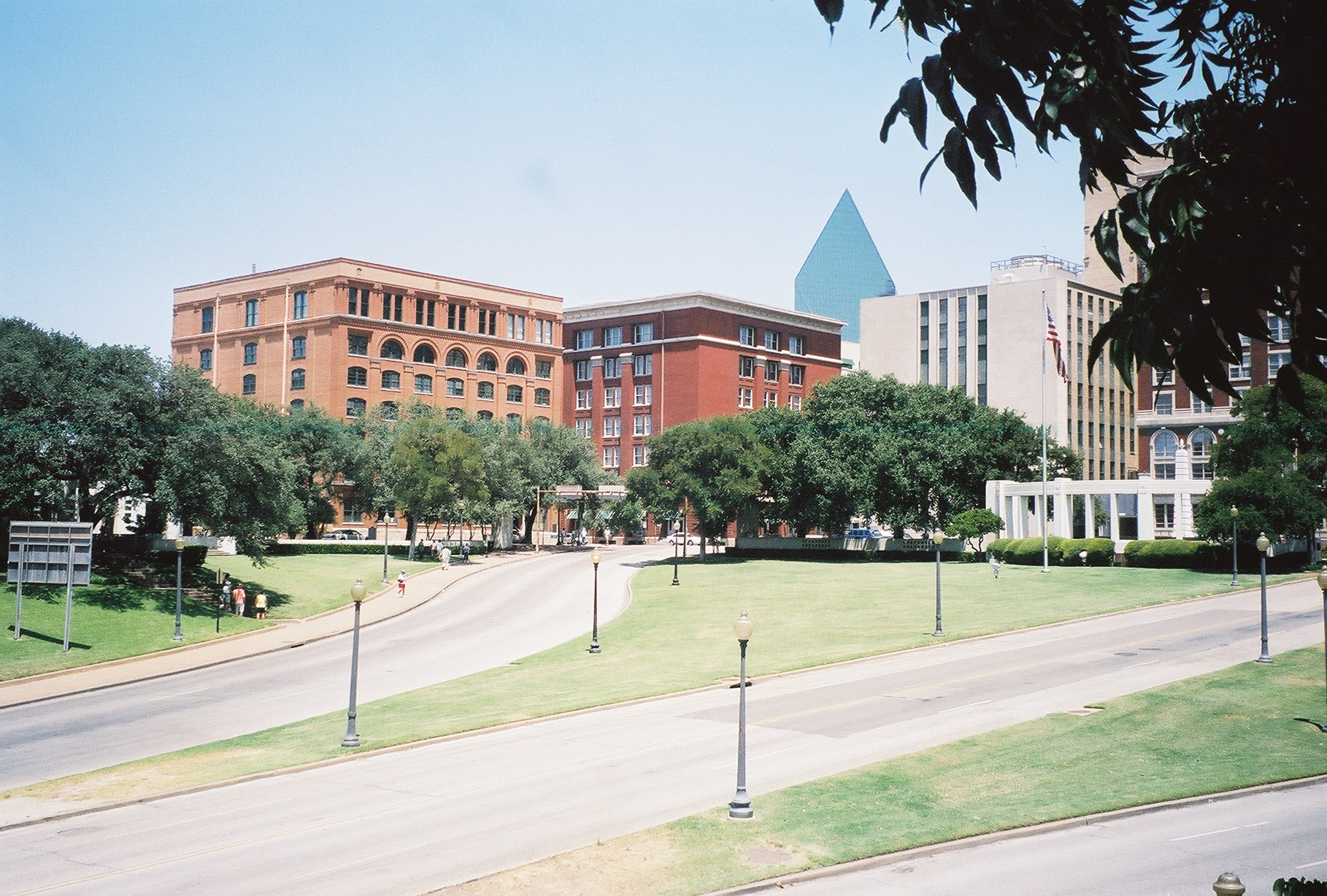
- View from southwest, with the former Texas School Book Depository at left, the Dal-Tex Building, center, and the Dallas County Records Annex, right (2003)
- Former names: Kingman Texas Implements Company Building, John Deere Plow Company Building
- Alternative names: Dallas Textile Building

General information
- Status: Completed
- Type: Brick
- Architectural style: Sullivanesque
- Location: 501 Elm St., Dallas, Texas, United States
- Coordinates: 32°46′43″N 96°48′30″W
- Completed: 1902; 124 years ago

Technical details
- Floor count: 7

Design and construction
- Architecture firm: Hubbell and Greene
- Texas School Book Depository
- U.S. Historic district – Contributing property
- U.S. National Historic Landmark District – Contributing property
- Dallas Landmark Historic District; Contributing Property
- Part of: West End Historic District (ID78002918); Dealey Plaza Historic District (ID93001607)
- DLMKHD No.: H/2 (West End HD)

Significant dates
- Designated CP: November 14, 1978
- Designated NHLDCP: October 12, 1993
- Designated DLMKHD: October 6, 1975

The Dal-Tex Building is a seven-story office building located at 501 Elm Street in the West End Historic District of downtown Dallas, Texas, United States. The building is on the northeast corner of Elm and North Houston streets, across the street from the Texas School Book Depository in Dealey Plaza, the scene of the assassination of U.S. President John F. Kennedy on November 22, 1963. The Dal-Tex Building, sometimes called the Dallas-Textiles Building, the Dal-Tex Market Building, or the Dal-Tex Mart Building, was a center of the textile business in Dallas.

3L Real Estate purchased the building in 2021. The developer is preparing to convert the building from office space to retail and multi-family residential while preserving the historic character of the structure. Additional funding was secured through property assessed clean energy financing coordinated with the City of Dallas and the Texas PACE Authority.

Designed by architects James P. Hubbell and Herbert Miller Greene as a warehouse for the Kingman Texas Implement Company, the building has been described as one of the "earliest Sullivanesque designs in Texas". The building has also been reported to show the Prairie School's influence on Greene.

== Assassination of Kennedy ==
Abraham Zapruder, who shot the famous Zapruder film, had his offices on the fourth floor of the Dal-Tex Building.

=== Conspiracy theories ===
Several conspiracy theories in the assassination of U.S. President John F. Kennedy allege that some of the shots fired at the President's motorcade originated from the Dal-Tex Building. In September 1966, Triumph's Lawrence R. Brown published an article stating that the bullet trajectories were traced back to a second-floor window in the Dal-Tex Building. Jim Garrison told Playboy in September 1967 that the building was "in all probability" one of four locations in which snipers fired at Kennedy. Garrison later claimed that there were four assassination teams, each consisting of a rifleman and a lookout, including one on the seventh floor of the building. In November 1967, Josiah Thompson stated that his study allowed him to conclude that there were four shots from three different firing positions during the assassination. Thompson also concluded that the Dal-Tex Building was located in a zone also including the Dallas County Records Building and parts of the Dallas Criminal Courts Building that he determined could have been the location for the source of the second shot. He said that a young man was arrested just minutes after the shooting, taken in for questioning by police, then disappeared in the confusion.

In the May 1970 issue of Computers and Automation, Richard E. Sprague said that he used computer analysis of still photographs and movie films taken in Dealey Plaza. Implicating four gunmen and at least 50 conspirators in Kennedy's assassination, he concluded that two shots had come from the Dal-Tex Building. Five years later in September 1975, Sprague and L. Fletcher Prouty stated that their study of still photographs and film of the assassination revealed that the fourth floor of the Dal-Tex Building was one of three or four firing positions during the assassination.

== Photo gallery ==
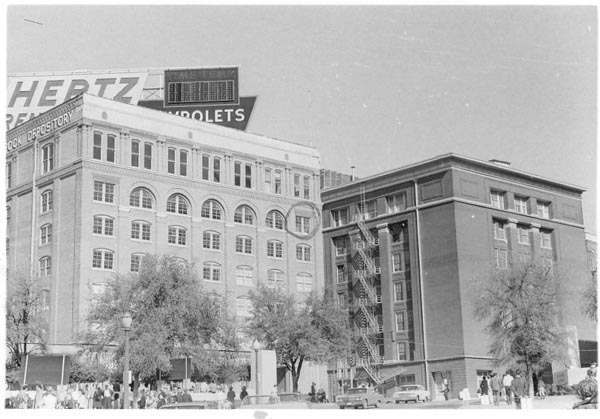
The Dal-Tex Building (right), across the street from the Texas School Book Depository Building

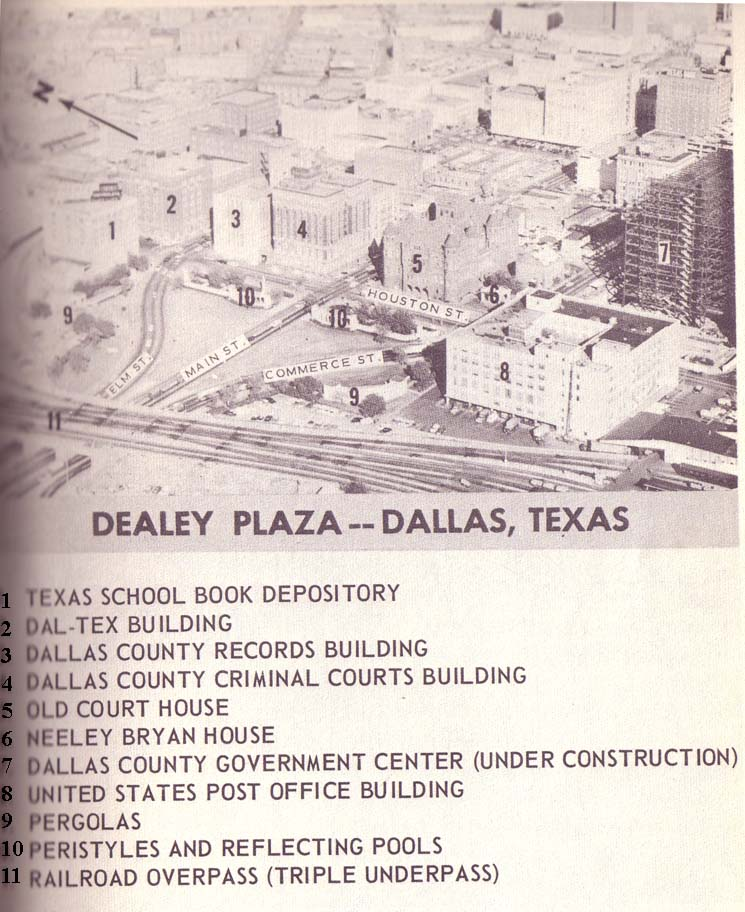
Warren Commission exhibit #876 showing the location of the Dal-Tex Building

== See also ==
- List of National Historic Landmarks in Texas
- National Register of Historic Places listings in Dallas County, Texas
- List of Dallas Landmarks
