= Texas School Book Depository =

Historic building in Dallas, Texas

- The Dallas County Administration Building in 2015, formerly the Texas School Book Depository

- Location within Texas Location within the United States
- Former names: Southern Rock Island Plow Company; Texas School Book Depository
- Alternative names: Dallas County Administration Building; The Sixth Floor Museum

General information
- Architectural style: Romanesque Revival
- Location: 411 Elm St. Dallas, Texas, United States
- Coordinates: 32°46′47″N 96°48′30″W
- Elevation: 455 feet (139 m)
- Construction started: 1901; 125 years ago
- Renovated: 1981; 45 years ago
- Cost: $3,040,510
- Owner: Dallas County

Technical details
- Structural system: B-Reinforced Concrete Frame Piers
- Floor count: 8
- Floor area: 80,000 square feet (7,400 m^{2})

Design and construction
- Main contractor: Rock Island Plow Company

Website
- The Sixth Floor Museum at Dealey Plaza
- Texas School Book Depository
- U.S. Historic district – Contributing property
- U.S. National Historic Landmark District – Contributing property
- Recorded Texas Historic Landmark
- Dallas Landmark Historic District; Contributing Property
- Part of: West End Historic District (ID78002918); Dealey Plaza Historic District (ID93001607)
- RTHL No.: 6895
- DLMKHD No.: H/2 (West End HD)

Significant dates
- Designated CP: November 14, 1978
- Designated NHLDCP: October 12, 1993
- Designated RTHL: 1981
- Designated DLMKHD: October 6, 1975

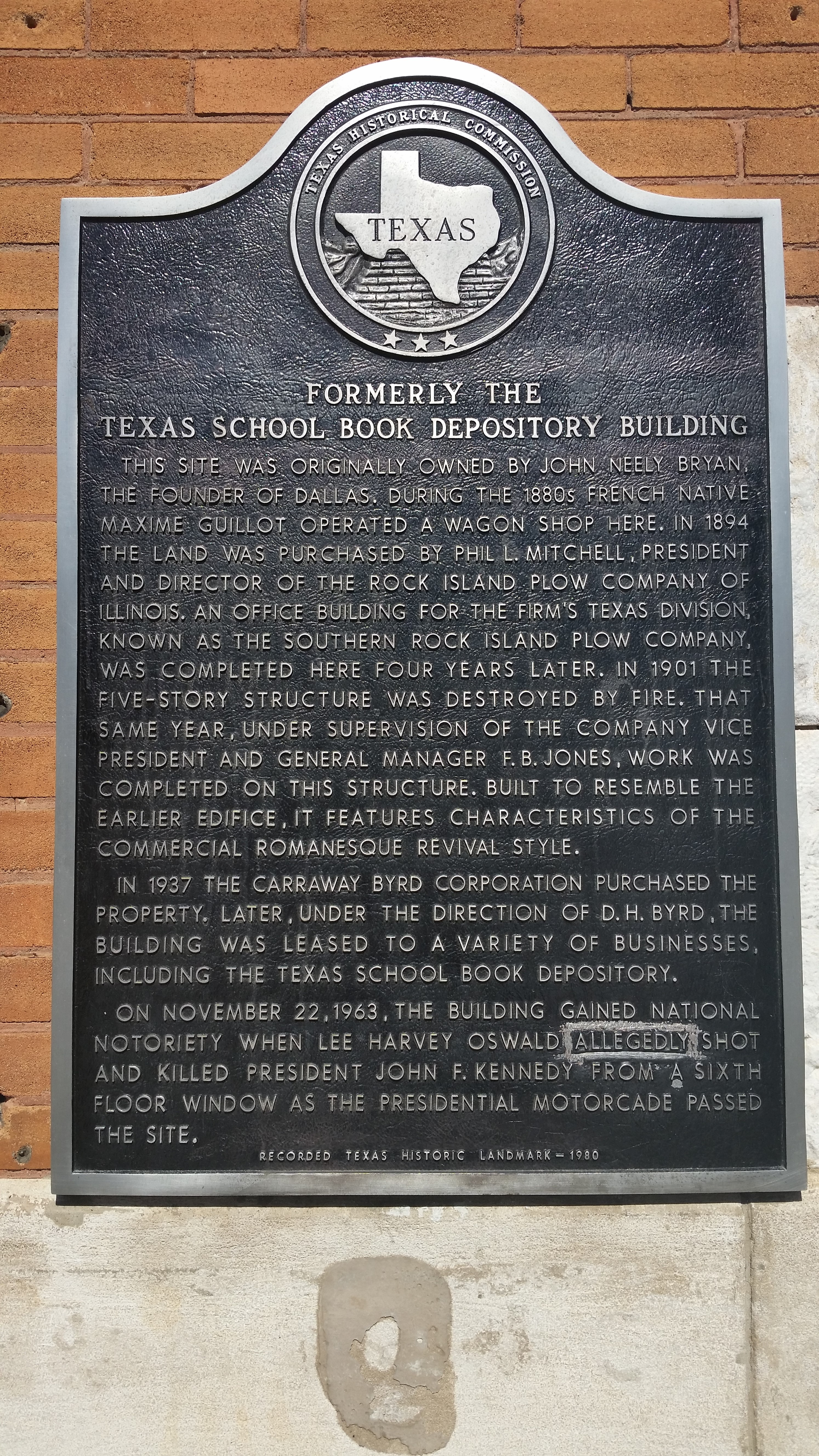
Texas historical marker for the Texas School Book Depository. The word "allegedly" has been highlighted by vandals.

The Texas School Book Depository, later known as the Dallas County Administration Building and now "The Sixth Floor Museum", is a seven-floor building facing Dealey Plaza in Dallas, Texas. Lee Harvey Oswald was working as an employee at the building when he assassinated United States President John F. Kennedy on November 22, 1963. Official government investigations (Note: These were investigations by: the Dallas Police Department, the Federal Bureau of Investigation (1963), the Warren Commission (1964), and the House Select Committee on Assassinations (1979).) concluded that Oswald shot Kennedy from a sixth floor window on the building's southeastern corner. The building, located at 411 Elm Street on the northwest corner of Elm and North Houston Streets in downtown Dallas, is a Texas Historic Landmark.

== Early history ==
The site was originally owned by John Neely Bryan. In the 1880s, Maxime Guillot operated a wagon shop on the property. In 1894, the Rock Island Plow Company bought the land, and four years later constructed a five-story building for its Texas division, the Southern Rock Island Plow Company. In 1901, the building was hit by lightning and nearly burned to the ground. It was rebuilt in 1902 in the Commercial Romanesque Revival style and expanded to seven stories. In 1937, the Carraway Byrd Corporation purchased the property, but they defaulted on the loan. It was sold at public auction in July 1939 and purchased by D. Harold Byrd.

Under Byrd's ownership, the building remained empty until 1940, when it was leased by grocery wholesaler John Sexton & Co. Sexton Foods used this location as the branch office for sales, manufacturing, and distribution for both the Southern United States and the Southwestern United States. In November 1961, Sexton Foods moved to a modern distribution facility located at 650 Regal Row in Dallas. By then, the building was known locally as the Sexton Building. The building was refurbished, and partitions, carpeting, air conditioning, and a new passenger elevator were added on the first four floors.

== Assassination of John F. Kennedy ==
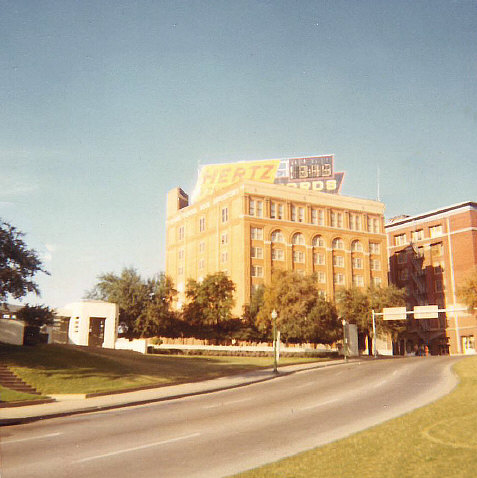
The building as the Texas School Book Depository.

In 1963, the building was in use as a multi-floor warehouse storing school textbooks and other related materials, and an order-fulfillment center by the privately owned Texas School Book Depository Company, which had moved from the first floor of the adjacent Dal-Tex Building. The company found that the upper floors had sustained oil damage from items stored there by the previous tenant, so they began to cover the floors with plywood to protect their books, stored in cardboard boxes, from the oil. At the time, the building had three elevators. The building's superintendent was Roy S. Truly (1907–1985), who detested Kennedy's pro-civil right stances, as historian William Manchester recounted in his semi-authorized account of the assassination, The Death of a President: November 20–25 (1967).

Work had begun on the west side of the sixth floor just before President Kennedy's motorcade, "leaving the whole scene in disarray, with stock shifted as far as the east wall, and stacks in between piled unusually high." The Warren Commission concluded that Lee Harvey Oswald, who was working as a temporary employee at the building, fired three shots from a sixth floor window at Kennedy's presidential motorcade on November 22, 1963 and that there was no evidence that Oswald was part of a conspiracy.

=== Second building ===
The Texas School Book Depository Company maintained a second warehouse at 1917 Houston Street, several blocks north of the main building. The short four-story structure was not on the parade route, half-hidden on an unpaved section of Houston Street. Oswald's supervisor Roy Truly told the Warren Commission that he had the option to assign Oswald to either building on his first day at work. "Oswald and another fellow reported for work on the same day [October 15] and I needed one of them for the depository building. I picked Oswald." This second building was eventually destroyed to make way for the Woodall Rodgers Freeway.

According to Manchester in his book, this warehouse prior to November 22 was "the better known" of the two warehouses.

== Later years ==
The mayor of Dallas, Wes Wise, saved the Texas School Book Depository from imminent destruction, preserving it for further research into the assassination.

The Texas School Book Depository Company moved out in 1970. The building was sold at auction to Aubrey Mayhew, a Nashville, Tennessee music producer and collector of Kennedy memorabilia, by the owner D. H. Byrd. In 1972, ownership reverted to Byrd. In 1977, the building was purchased by the government of Dallas County. After renovating the lower five floors of the building for use as county government offices, the Dallas County Administration Building was dedicated in March 1981. The 1991 film JFK was shot at the building, production paid $50,000 to put someone in the window from which Oswald was supposed to have shot Kennedy. They were allowed to film in that location only between certain hours with only five people on the floor at one time: the camera crew, an actor and Stone. Co-producer Clayton Townsend has said that the hardest part was getting the permission to restore the building to the way it looked back in 1963. It took five months of negotiation.

On President's Day 1989, the sixth floor opened to the public, for an admission charge, as the Sixth Floor Museum of assassination-related exhibits. On President's Day 2002, the seventh-floor gallery opened. The gallery opened in February 2002 with the exhibit: "The Pulitzer Prize Photographs: Capture the Moment". A $2.5 million renovation turned the storage area on the seventh floor into a new gallery space for the museum. Other exhibits that have hung in the space include works of Andy Warhol.

In May 2010, burglars attempted to steal a safe from the Sixth Floor Museum, but fled when "they were confronted by a security guard," leaving the unopened safe suspended from a winch on the back of a truck.

A marker on the front of the building reads, "On November 22, 1963, the building gained national notoriety when Lee Harvey Oswald allegedly shot and killed president John F. Kennedy from a sixth floor window as the presidential motorcade passed the site." Kennedy assassination conspiracy theorists have vandalized the marker, carving a gash around the word "allegedly" to highlight it. The Sixth Floor Museum neither encourages nor discourages the idea of conspiracy theories.

== See also ==
- List of National Historic Landmarks in Texas
- National Register of Historic Places listings in Dallas County, Texas
- Recorded Texas Historic Landmarks in Dallas County
- List of Dallas Landmarks
- Assassination of John F. Kennedy in popular culture
