= Dealey Plaza =

Historic district in Dallas, Texas, US

- Dealey Plaza Historic District
- U.S. National Register of Historic Places
- U.S. National Historic Landmark District
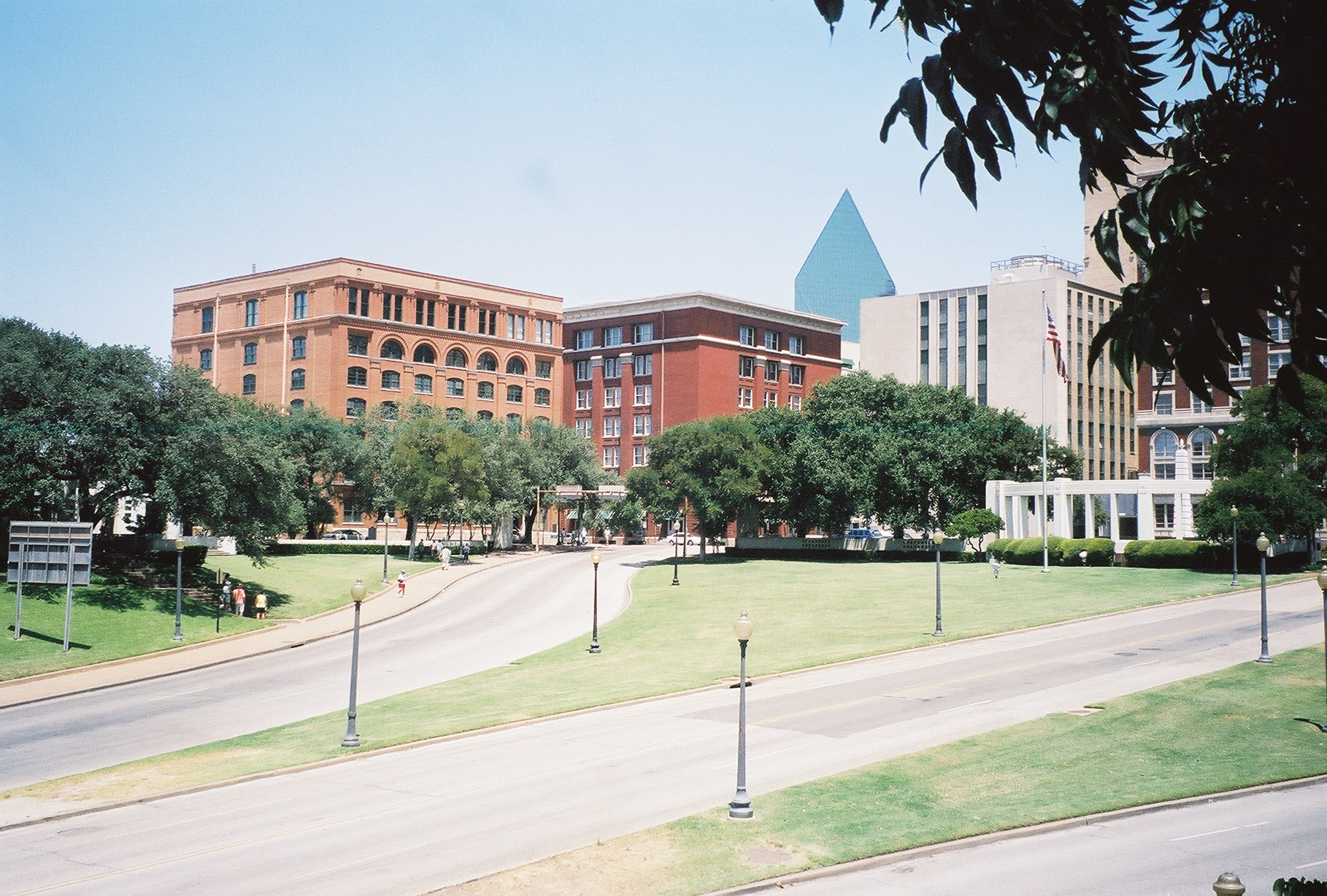
- View from southwest, with the former Texas School Book Depository building at left, Dal-Tex Building in center, and the Dallas County Records Annex at right, 2003

- Location within Texas Location within the United States
- Location: Roughly bounded by Pacific Avenue, Market Street, Jackson Street and right of way of Dallas Right of Way Management Company, Dallas, Texas
- Coordinates: 32°46′43″N 96°48′31″W
- Area: 15 acres (6.1 ha)
- Built: 1890
- Architect: Multiple
- Architectural style: Chicago, Early Commercial, Romanesque
- NRHP reference No.: 93001607

Significant dates
- Added to NRHP: April 19, 1993
- Designated NHLD: October 12, 1993

Dealey Plaza /ˈdiːliː/, named after George Dealey, is a city park in the West End Historic District of downtown Dallas, Texas. It is sometimes called the "birthplace of Dallas", and was the location of the assassination of John F. Kennedy in 1963. The Dealey Plaza Historic District was named a National Historic Landmark on the 30th anniversary of the assassination, to preserve Dealey Plaza, street rights-of-way, buildings, and structures by the plaza visible from the assassination site, which have been identified as witness locations or as possible locations for the assassin.

== National Historic Landmark ==
The Dealey Plaza Historic District was added to the National Register of Historic Places (NRHP) in 1993 and designated a National Historic Landmark the same year. The former county courthouse is individually listed on the National Register and is also designated a State Antiquities Landmark (SAL) and a Recorded Texas Historic Landmark (RTHL). Additional properties within the district are also RTHLs. The following are contributing properties and other significant buildings within the historic district.:

=== Contributing buildings ===
- Texas School Book Depository (RTHL #6895, 1981), 411 Elm Street – Now known as the Dallas County Administration Building, this seven-story structure is where Lee Harvey Oswald fired the shot killing President Kennedy from the sixth-floor window at the building's southeastern corner at North Houston Street. The 1901 building houses the Sixth Floor Museum.
- Dal-Tex Building and Annex, 501 Elm Street – This seven-story building sits immediately east across North Houston Street from the Texas School Book Depository and is cater-corner from Dealey Plaza. The 1902 building has a three-story annex on the north to Pacific Avenue and was constructed in 1904.

- Dallas County Records Building (RTHL #6668, 1985), 509 Main Street – The original Records Building occupies half of the city block between Elm and Main along what was formerly Record Street, now part of Founders Plaza to the east. The building features cut limestone with Gothic detailing and was completed in 1928.
- Dallas County Records Building Annex, 500 Elm Street – The 1955 annex to the Records Building has its primary facade along Elm Street facing the Dal-Tex Building. The seven-story annex occupies the northwest quadrant of the block holding the original building, and it overlooks Dealey Plaza across North Houston Street to the west. The building holds a loading dock to the south.

- Dallas County Criminal Courts Building (RTHL #6667, 1986), 501 Main Street – The Criminal Courts Building is a Renaissance Revival edifice of eight stories constructed between 1913 and 1915. Its primary facade faces Main Street, and it has a secondary facade facing North Houston Street and Dealey Plaza. It is on the southwest quadrant of the block immediately adjacent to the original Records Building and separated from the Records Annex by the annex's loading dock.

The Old Dallas County Courthouse

- Old Dallas County Courthouse (NRHP #76002019, 1976; SAL #8200000203, 1981; RTHL #6811, 1977), 100 South Houston Street – The Romanesque Revival courthouse building was constructed between 1890 and 1892 as the county's sixth courthouse. The building is situated on the east side of South Houston Street directly across from Dealey Plaza on the block between Main and Commerce. Also known as the "Old Red Courthouse", it is constructed of Pecos red sandstone and Little Rock blue granite. The three-story building features two 118-foot (36 m) columns of Texas granite at each of the four entrances with a central 118-foot (36 m) main column. The building now houses the Old Red Museum of Dallas County History & Culture.
- United States Post Office Terminal Annex, 207 South Houston Street – This structure of subdued Art Deco and Classical styles was constructed in 1937 as a New Deal public works project. The public entrances and primary facade are along the west side of South Houston Street between Commerce and Jackson Streets. The rear of the building features loading bays along the railroad line as bulk mail was primarily transported by rail during the building's earlier decades. Similar loading bays for freight trucks line the building's south side. The lobby of the five-story building features two large murals by artist Peter Hurd. The building now houses federal government offices.
- Union Terminal Company Interlocking Tower, near Pacific Avenue in railroad yard – This two-story concrete tower covered with white-painted stucco was constructed in 1916. The building is in the rail yard west of the School Book Depository, and features a hipped roof with wide overhangs. The first floor is accessed from the east and contained mechanical equipment. The second floor is reached by stairs from the south and held a central switching console and windows overlooking all sides.

=== Contributing sites ===
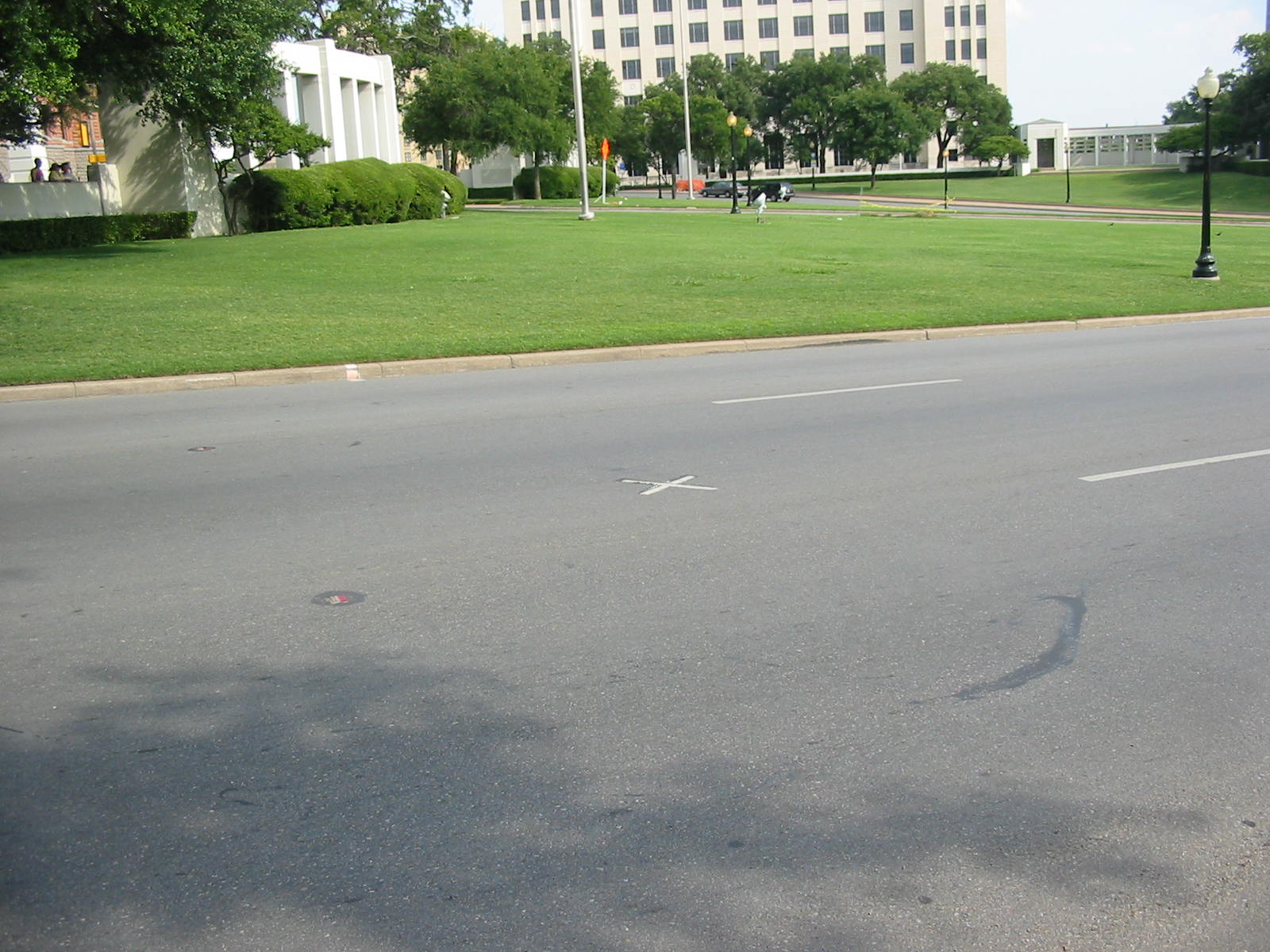
Street mark at the assassination site

- Kennedy assassination site, Elm Street between North Houston Street and the Triple Underpass – Although it is occasionally removed, a white "X" on the Elm Street pavement usually marks the spot where President Kennedy was fatally shot.
- Missouri-Kansas-Texas Railroad Yards, West of North Houston Street between Elm Street and Pacific Avenue – Six railroad tracks running from north to south converge into four at the Triple Underpass. Five curved rail spurs have since been removed and replaced with parking. The yard, which extends west and north of the School Book Depository, includes the Interlocking Tower and a small office or shed.

=== Contributing structures ===
- Reflecting pools and colonnades, Dealey Plaza along Houston Street – Two reflecting pools extend along Houston Street within the plaza with each extending from Main Street to the edges of the plaza. Both pools are rectangular on their ends near Main and oval-shaped at their ends along the edges. Curved concrete colonnades with pylons at the ends run along the west of each reflecting pool. Concrete planters holding oak trees are placed between the pools and the colonnades. East from the planter box on the north side of Main Street is a tall, graduated obelisk. Immediately west of the obelisk is a bronze bas relief marker mounted on red granite illustrating President Kennedy's visit to Dallas.
- Pergolas, Dealey Plaza along Elm and Commerce streets – Two concrete columnar pergolas, one north of Elm Street and the other south of Commerce Street, symmetrically gate the portion of Dealey Plaza where Elm and Commerce converge toward Main Street as they approach the Triple Underpass. Both pergolas are reached by broad steps ascending the grassy inclines approaching from the streets. The Elm Street pergola, located adjacent to the Grassy Knoll, has a historical marker honoring John Neely Bryan, Dallas' founder. The Commerce Street pergola has a marker describing the pioneer Cockrell family. Cedar fencing in the vicinity of both pergolas originally separated Dealey Plaza from surrounding properties, but these are best preserved at the Bryan pergola where the fencing was restored in 1988.
- Triple Underpass, west edge of Dealey Plaza at convergence of Elm, Main, and Commerce streets – This unpainted concrete railroad overpass was constructed by the Works Progress Administration along with the other original amenities of Dealey Plaza. The Art Deco-styled facility features square balusters and square columns reminiscent of other structures within the park.

=== Contributing objects ===
- Dealey Statue, 101 South Houston Street – The Dealey Statue, featuring the likeness of the plaza's namesake George Dealey, is located on the south side of the Main Street entrance to the plaza along Houston Street The bronze statue replaced an obelisk in 1949 which was originally paired with the existing obelisk across Main Street to the north. The statue was sculpted in 1948 by Felix de Weldon and is mounted atop a tall red granite plinth. Behind the statue is a red granite slab with four bronze bas relief tablets consistent in appearance to the Kennedy marker behind the north obelisk. The tablets describe Dealey's professional and community accomplishments.

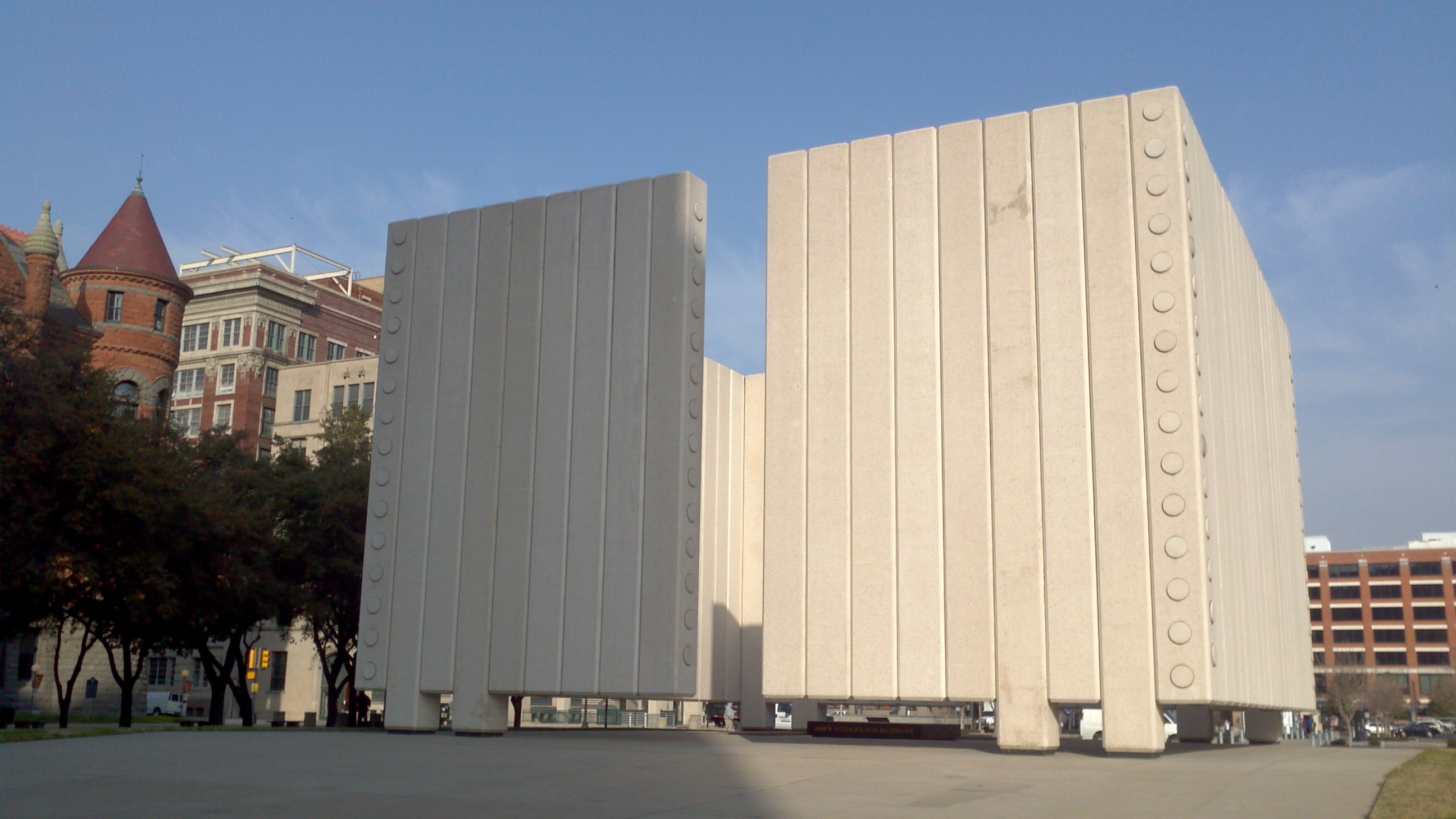
Kennedy Memorial

- Kennedy Memorial and Plaza, 600 Main Street – The Kennedy Memorial and Plaza is located between Main and Commerce Streets west of South Market Street. The 1969 memorial is located within the middle of a plaza on the eastern half of a double block it shares with the former county courthouse due to the previous closure of Record Street. The memorial plaza sits above an underground parking structure and includes trees and benches around the memorial. The Kennedy Memorial is a cenotaph designed by architect Philip Johnson featuring a 50-by-50-foot (15 m) open space with 30-foot (9.1 m) vertically scored concrete walls. Two narrow openings extend to the top in the middle of the north and south walls. In the center of the memorial is a square 8-foot (2.4 m) black granite slab with the president's name engraved in gold.

Dealey Plaza and all of the contributing buildings are part of the Westend Historic District (NRHP #78002918, 1978; Dallas Landmark Historic District #H/2, 1975) with the single exception of the U.S. Post Office Terminal Annex which is outside of the boundaries of that district. The Kennedy Memorial and Plaza is the only contributing property not in existence at the time of the assassination nor in view of its site.

=== Non-contributing buildings ===
- Sixth Floor Museum Visitor Center Building, North Houston Street adjacent to Texas School Book Depository – The Visitor Center is a one-story brick building north of the School Book Depository extending along North Houston Street toward Pacific Avenue. The building, constructed in 1989, is designed to mimic the materials and architectural elements of the School Book Depository from which it is connected with a stone and glass hyphen. A free-standing brick elevator tower connects the center to the Sixth Floor Museum in the depository building. The building is out of view from the assassination site, but it does have an open porch overlooking the Grassy Knoll.
- Railroad Office/Shed, near Pacific Avenue east of Interlocking Tower – This is a small one-story brick building constructed after the 1989 demolition of a predecessor which was erected at some point between 1930 and 1950 near the same location. The previous structure was listed as a compatible, but not a contributing property within the Westend District.

== History ==
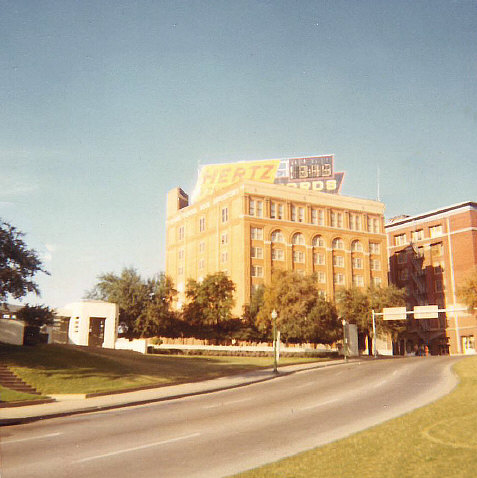
Dealey Plaza in 1969, with the Texas School Book Depository in the background

Dealey Plaza was built on land donated by early Dallas philanthropist and businesswoman Sarah Horton Cockrell. It was the location of the first home built in Dallas, which also became the first courthouse and post office, the first store, and the first fraternal lodge. It is sometimes called the "birthplace of Dallas".

The plaza was completed in 1940 as a WPA project on the west edge of downtown Dallas, where three streets converge, Main Street, Elm Street, and Commerce Street, to pass under a railroad bridge known locally as the "triple underpass."

The plaza is named for George Bannerman Dealey (1859–1946), a civic leader and early publisher of The Dallas Morning News, who had campaigned for the area's revitalization. Monuments outlining the plaza honor previous prominent Dallas residents, and predate President John F. Kennedy's visit by many years. The monument honoring President Kennedy, in the form of a cenotaph, is one block away.

== John F. Kennedy assassination ==
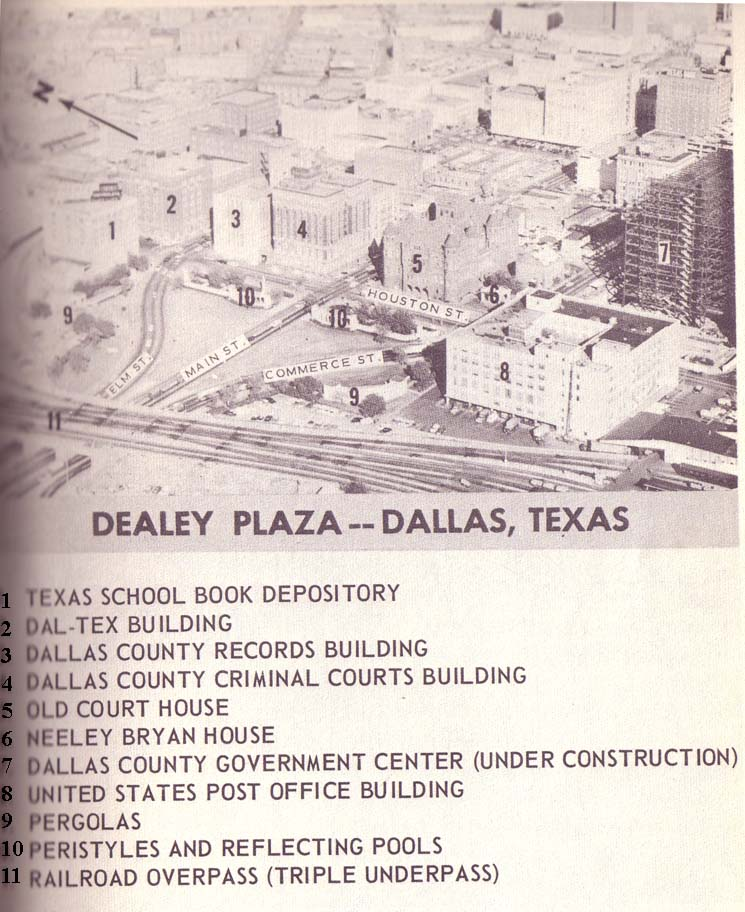
Warren Commission diagram of plaza

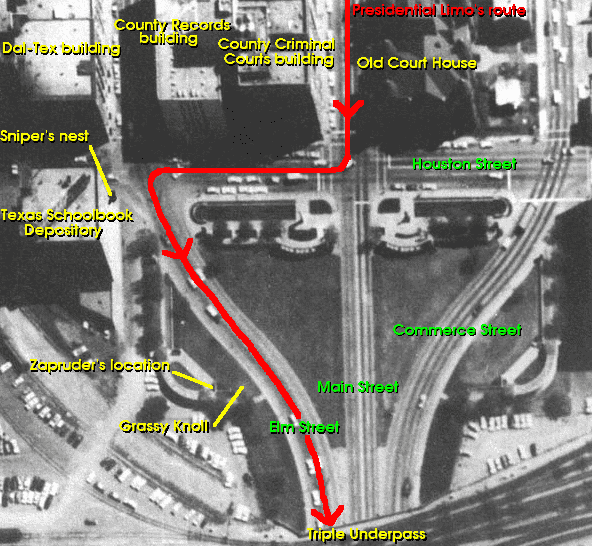
The path of the motorcade. North is almost directly leftward.

Dealey Plaza is bounded on the south, east, and north sides by buildings at least 100 feet (30 m) tall. One of those buildings is the former Texas School Book Depository building, from which, both the Warren Commission and the House Select Committee on Assassinations concluded, Lee Harvey Oswald fired a rifle which killed President Kennedy. 30 minutes after the shooting, Kennedy died at Parkland Memorial Hospital. There is also a grassy knoll on the northwest side of the plaza. At the plaza's west perimeter is a triple underpass beneath a railroad bridge, under which the motorcade raced after the shots were fired.

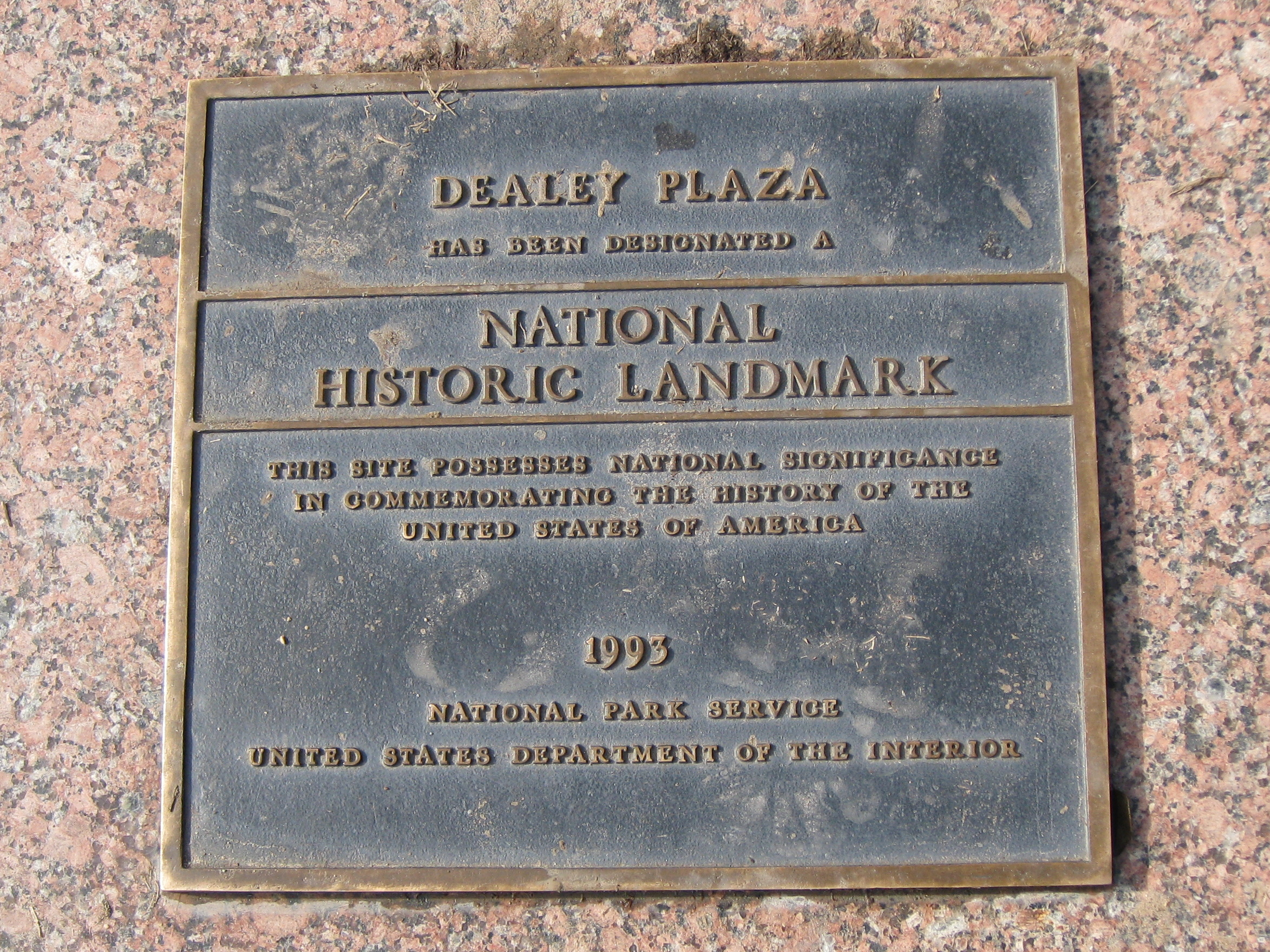
National Historic Landmark plaque at Dealey Plaza.

Today, the plaza is typically visited daily by tourists. The Sixth Floor Museum now occupies the top two floors of the seven-story former Book Depository. Since 1989, more than six million people have visited the museum.

Oliver Stone recreated the Kennedy assassination at Dealey Plaza for his 1991 film JFK. His producers had to pay the Dallas City Council a substantial amount of money to hire police to reroute traffic and close streets for three weeks. The production spent $4 million to restore Dealey Plaza to 1963 conditions.

The National Park Service designated Dealey Plaza a National Historic Landmark District on November 22, 1993, the 30th anniversary of the JFK assassination, roughly encompassing the area between Pacific Avenue, Market and Jackson streets and the former railroad tracks. Therefore, nothing of significance has been torn down or rebuilt in the immediate area. A small plaque commemorating the assassination is located in the plaza.

Visitors to Dealey Plaza today will see street lights and street signs which were in use in 1963. Some have been moved to different locations and others removed entirely. Buildings immediately surrounding the plaza have not been changed since 1963, presenting a stark contrast to the ultra-modern Dallas skyline which rises behind it.

Over more than half-a-century, Elm Street has been resurfaced several times, street lane stripes have been relocated, and sidewalk lamp posts have been moved and added. Trees, bushes and hedges have grown, and some traffic sign locations have been changed, relocated or removed. On November 22, 2003, the 40th anniversary of the assassination, the city of Dallas approved construction project plans to restore Dealey Plaza to its exact appearance on November 22, 1963. The first phase of the restoration, which cost $700,000 for repair work and plumbing along Houston Streets, was completed on November 22, 2008, the 45th anniversary.

== Grassy knoll ==
The Grassy Knoll and Bryan pergola on the north side of Elm Street

The grassy knoll is a small, sloping hill inside Dealey Plaza which became of interest following the assassination of United States President John F. Kennedy. The knoll was above Kennedy and to his right (west and north).

This north grassy knoll is adjacent to the former Texas School Book Depository building along the Elm Street abutment side street to the northeast, Elm Street, and a sidewalk to the south, a parking lot to the north and east and a railroad bridge atop the triple underpass convergence of Commerce, Main and Elm streets to the west.

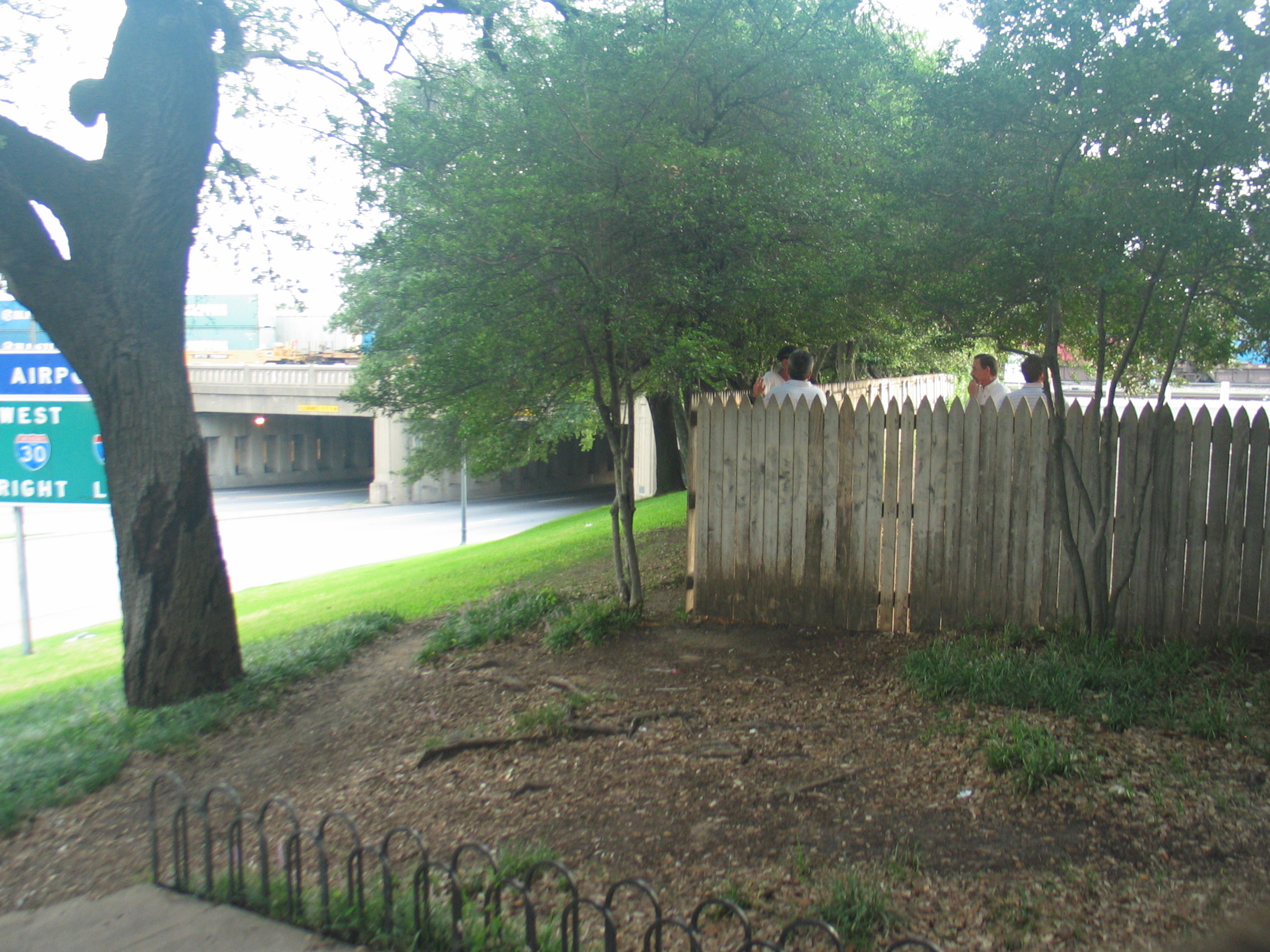
The wooden picket fence atop the grassy knoll, and the Triple Underpass with the highway sign, which at the time of the assassination read "Fort Worth Turnpike Keep Right", as seen in the Zapruder film. The knoll is where many conspiracy theorists believe another gunman stood.

Located near the north grassy knoll on November 22, 1963, there were several witnesses, three large traffic signposts, four sidewalk lamp posts, the John Neely Bryan north pergola concrete structure including its two enclosed shelters, a tool shed, one concrete wall 3.3 feet (1 m) high connected to each of the pergola shelters; ten tall, wide, low-hanging live oak trees; a five-foot-high (1.5 m), wooden, cornered, stockade fenceline measured at approximately 169 feet (52 m) long; six street curb sewer openings, their sewer manholes and their interconnecting large pipes; and several 2 to 6 feet (60 to 180 cm) tall bushes, trees and hedges.

The term "grassy knoll" was first used to describe this area by reporter Albert Merriman Smith, known as Smitty, of UPI, who was riding in the press "pool car" following 150 to 200 yards (140 to 180 m) behind Kennedy's car and had use of the car's radio-telephone. In his second dispatch from the car just 25 minutes after the shooting, he said, "Some of the Secret Service agents thought the gunfire was from an automatic weapon fired to the right rear of the president's car, probably from a grassy knoll to which police rushed." These words were then repeated on national television by CBS News anchor Walter Cronkite in his second CBS bulletin on the shooting.

Smitty, who was the main UPI reporter covering the presidential motorcade and was seated in the front seat of the sixth car known as the White House Pool car or the wire car, (Note: The wire car was the sixth car in the procession and was 150 to 200 yards behind Kennedy's car, followed by a Secret Service car which was followed by Vice-President Johnson's car, then another Secret Service car, the last car in the presidential motorcade. The White House reporters vehicle was the first vehicle following the presidential motorcade.) used a radiotelephone to file his report with the UPI office when shots had been fired at President Kennedy. Smith popularized the term "grassy knoll" and received the 1964 Pulitzer Prize for his reporting.

After he filed his report, which took several minutes, the radiotelephone went dead before the main Associated Press reporter Jack Bell, who was seated in the back seat near Smith, could file his own report. Robert MacNeil, a White House reporter for NBC News who exited one of the two press buses immediately after the shots were fired, ran with some police officers up the grassy knoll and over the fence but found no one there. (Note: Bobby Hargis, a Dallas policeman who was riding a Harley-Davidson as a police escort, dismounted his motorcycle and ran up the grassy knoll where he believed shots had been fired. Gordon Arnold stated he was on the grassy knoll filming the motorcade as the shots were being fired near him but, later, officials had confiscated his film.) He then entered the nearby book depository building to find a telephone with which to file his report.

As the first shot was fired, Mary Moorman, who was with her friend Jean Hill as the two watched the motorcade pass, took a Polaroid picture of the grassy knoll with President Kennedy in the second car in the foreground: Moorman and Hill were close, only about 10 to 15 feet (3 to 5 m) away. (Note: After the shots had been fired, Jay Skaggs photographed Jean Hill while she was on the grassy knoll near a tree.) Abraham Zapruder's film contains footage of the two women near Kennedy's presidential motorcade but no footage of the grassy knoll. The Associated Press used a copy of Moorman's Polaroid photo in its reporting of the events at Dealey Plaza during JFK's assassination.

Out of the 104 Dealey Plaza earwitness reports published by the Commission and elsewhere, 56 recorded testimony they remembered hearing at least one shot fired from either the Depository or near the Houston/Elm Street intersection. Thirty-five witnesses recorded testimony of at least one shot fired from either the grassy knoll or the triple underpass. Eight stated they heard shots being fired from elsewhere, and five testified the shots were fired from two different directions. (Note: Since the first national broadcast by a major television network of the Zapruder film on March 6, 1975, on the ABC late-night television show Good Night America hosted by Geraldo Rivera, most Americans believe there were at least two gunmen, not just Oswald; however, in January 2021, both James Woolsey and Ion Mihai Pacepa wrote in their book Operation Dragon: Inside the Kremlin's Secret War on America, Oswald acted as a lone gunman. In November 2021, forensic pathologist Dr. Cyril Wecht published the book The JFK Assassination Dissected: An Analysis by Forensic Pathologist Cyril Wecht which questioned the lone gunman theory in which Oswald had acted alone.)

== Gallery ==
Dealey Plaza (2015) as viewed from Reunion Tower. Shown are the Texas School Book Depository and the "grassy knoll" in the upper center, the seven-story Dal-Tex Building, and the Dallas County Records Building.

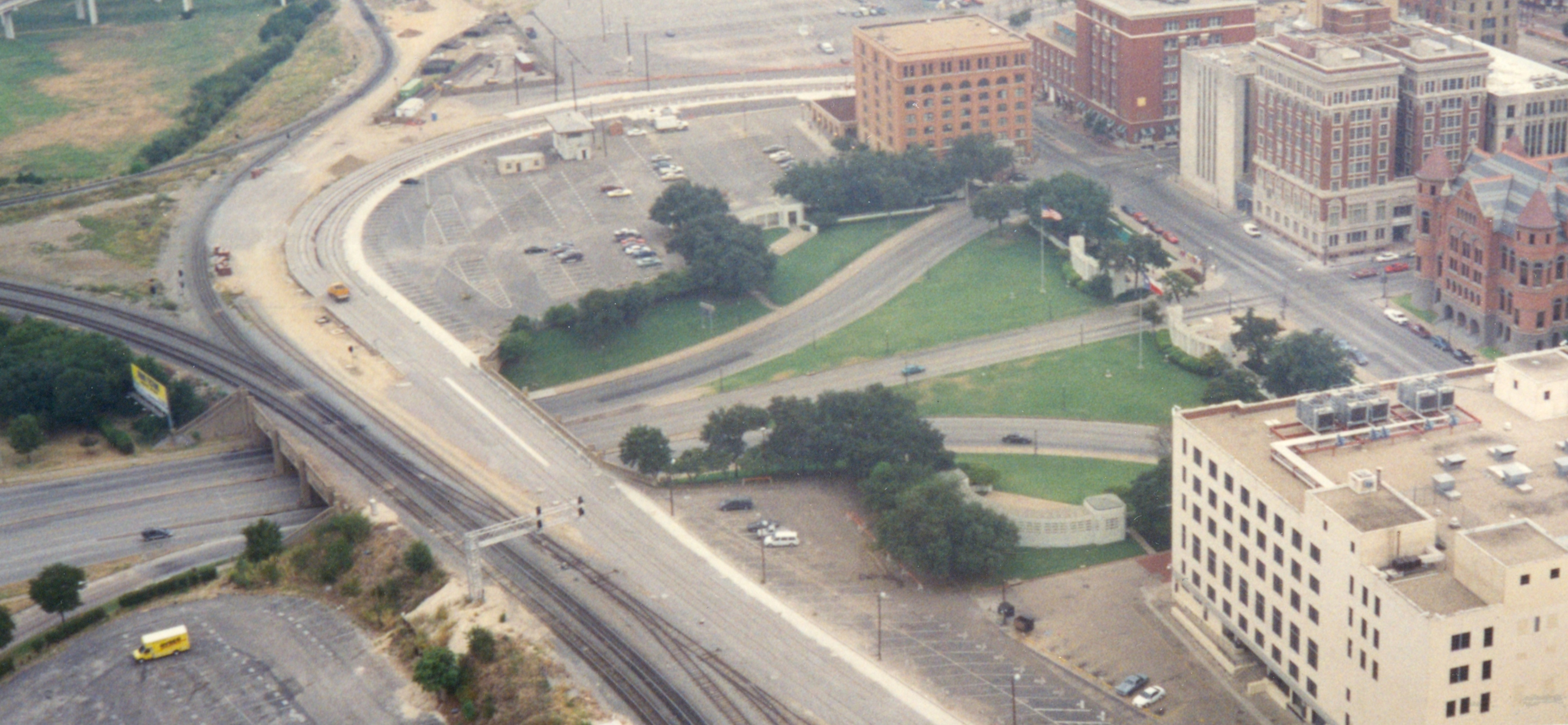
A similar view of Dealey Plaza from the mid-1990s also includes the Art Deco Terminal Annex Federal Building in the lower-right foreground, the former Dallas County Courthouse made of red sandstone, and the Dallas County Criminal Courts Building adjacent to the Dallas County Records Building.

== See also ==
- List of National Historic Landmarks in Texas
- National Register of Historic Places listings in Dallas County, Texas
- Assassination of John F. Kennedy in popular culture
