= Badge Man =

Unverified person

The degraded original version of the Moorman photograph: the Badge Man is purportedly located behind the stockade fence at photo center. While the photo itself is 2.875 inches (73.0 mm) wide, the Badge Man is just 1/69 of an inch (0.37 mm). Abraham Zapruder is also visible in the far right of the photo, standing on top of a 4-foot (1.2 m) concrete abutment extending from the John Neely Bryan concrete pergola on the grassy knoll.

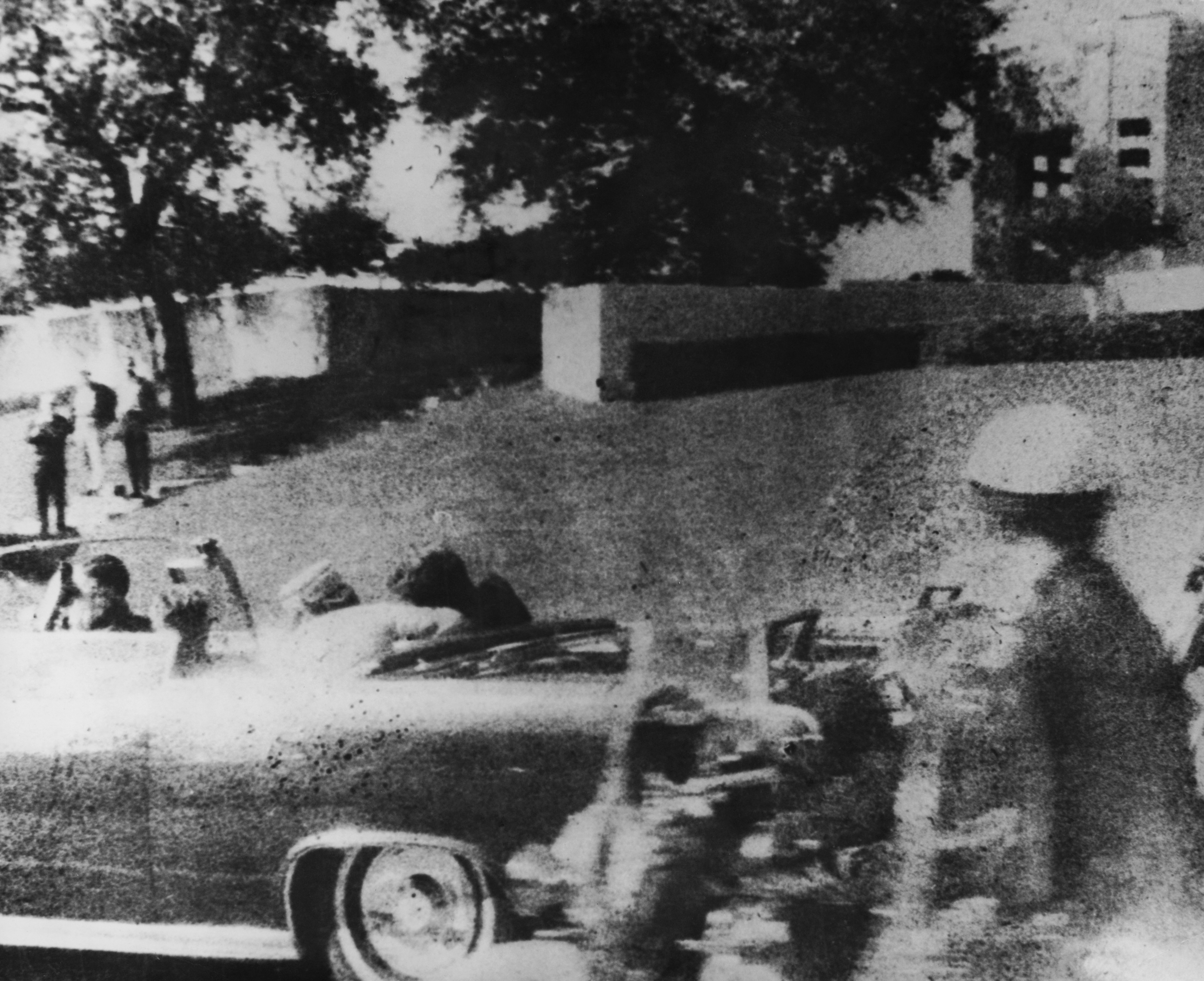
A first-generation version of the Moorman photograph

The Badge Man is a figure that is purportedly present within the Mary Moorman photograph of the assassination of United States president John F. Kennedy in Dealey Plaza on November 22, 1963. Some conspiracy theorists have suggested that this figure is a gunman firing a weapon at the president from the grassy knoll. Although a reputed muzzle flash obscures much of the detail, the Badge Man has been described as a person wearing a police uniform—the moniker itself derives from a bright spot on the chest, which is said to resemble a gleaming badge.

The Moorman photograph was taken a fraction of a second after the fatal bullet struck Kennedy's head. It was analyzed by the House Select Committee on Assassinations, but no evidence of hidden figures was found. In 1983, Gary Mack—the curator of the Sixth Floor Museum—obtained a higher-quality copy of the photograph. Upon enhancement, Mack noted what he believed to be the Badge Man in the shadowed background. This alleged second gunman has appeared in several conspiracy theories concerning the assassination of President Kennedy.

Among photographic experts, the consensus is that the image lacks the resolution to determine whether or not the Badge Man is a human figure. The reputed Badge Man is not present in any other photographs of the assassination and was not seen by any witnesses. Former Los Angeles County Deputy District Attorney Vincent Bugliosi criticized the Badge Man interpretation, and analyst Dale K. Myers has argued that it is not an actual person due to proportional discrepancies. It has been suggested that the figure is actually an optical distortion from a Coca-Cola bottle, or simply different background elements.

== Moorman photograph ==
The 35th president of the United States, John F. Kennedy, was assassinated on November 22, 1963, while riding in a motorcade through Dealey Plaza in Dallas, Texas. During the assassination, Dallas resident Mary Moorman took a series of photographs with her Polaroid camera. She captured images of the presidential limousine, several other close witnesses, including Abraham Zapruder filming, two Dallas police motorcycle escorts, and the "grassy knoll" beside the motorcade route. The Badge Man is reputedly visible in Moorman's fifth and most famous photo of the area, taken almost exactly at the moment of the fatal shot. This photo has been calculated to have been captured between Zapruder film frames 315 and 316, less than one-sixth of a second after President Kennedy was shot in the head at frame 313.

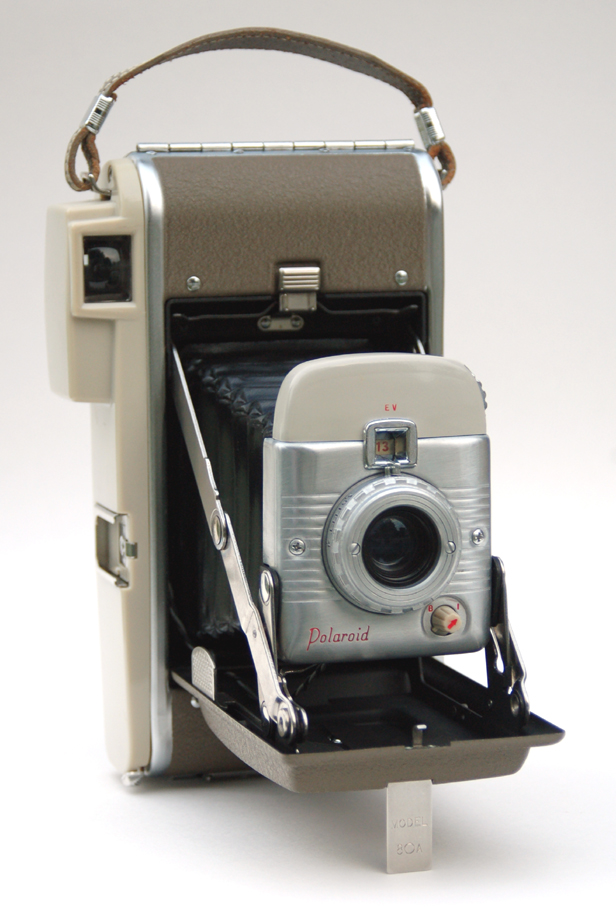
Mary Moorman took the photo using a Polaroid Highlander 80A.

In the immediate aftermath of the shooting, police officers and spectators ran to the grassy knoll, from where some witnesses believed the shots had originated, but no sniper was found. The Warren Commission concluded that Lee Harvey Oswald was the sole shooter, and that he had shot Kennedy from the Texas School Book Depository building. Some conspiracy theorists speculate that there was an assassin behind the wooden picket fence on top of the grassy knoll. For her part, Moorman told Larry Sabato that she did not see anything out of the ordinary behind the fence and that she remained unconvinced that a second shooter was revealed in her photograph.

Moorman's photograph was not included in the Warren Commission's 1964 report or its supporting documents. Moorman stated that she had been invited to provide testimony to the Commission, but asked for a postponement after injuring her ankle, and was not contacted again. In the late 1970s, the House Select Committee on Assassinations (HSCA)—which concluded that there was a second assassin on the grassy knoll based on now disputed acoustic evidence—deemed the photo of interest to its investigation.

With the unaided eye, the HSCA photographic evidence panel could find no figures in the shadowed background. The HSCA then sent the Moorman photo to the Rochester Institute of Technology (RIT) for enlargement, enhancement, and analysis. The RIT report found no evidence of human forms anywhere in the background, and the specific area behind the stockade fence was deemed to be so underexposed that it was impossible to glean any information from it. The HSCA concluded that if the Moorman photo "did not contain images that might be construed to be a figure behind the fence, it would be a troubling lack of corroboration for the acoustical analysis". The examined photo was the original copy, which had greatly degraded by that point.

== Photograph enhancement ==
=== Gary Mack ===
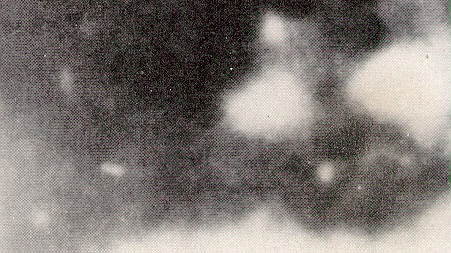
Jack White's enlargement of the Badge Man from the UPI copy

In 1983, Gary Mack obtained an 8-by-10-inch (200 mm × 250 mm) UPI copy of the Mary Moorman photograph of higher quality than the degraded original. The curator of the Sixth Floor Museum at Dealey Plaza (the former Texas School Book Depository), (Note: The Polaroid series 30 film that Moorman's camera used required a protective coating to maintain quality and prevent fingerprints. This coating was applied either too late or improperly, which led to the original photo's deteriorated state. The UPI versions were created from the original prior to its degradation. However, due to the nature of the duplication process, these images are of lower resolution than that of the then undeteriorated original.) Mack was described by skeptic Vincent Bugliosi as one of the few respected Kennedy assassination conspiracy theorists. After noticing what he thought was a human face in the shadowed background, Mack contacted Jack White—a friend and darkroom technician—to study the photograph. Upon enhancement, they identified an individual wearing a uniform—possibly that of a Dallas police officer—standing behind the stockade fence, with his face obscured by a muzzle flash, but with a small bright object visible on his chest. They interpreted this to be a badge, hence "Badge Man".

Mack, White, and other conspiracy theorists have attempted to connect Badge Man with the claims of Gordon Arnold. When analyzing the photo, Mack initially considered whether the figure may in fact be Arnold, a soldier who claimed to be on the grassy knoll with a movie camera. Arnold—who first came forward in 1978—claimed that he had filmed the assassination and that a police officer had confiscated his film after the shooting. Some theorists claim that this officer was also the Badge Man. Arnold is not visible in any photographs taken of the area, which Bugliosi calls "conclusive photographic proof that Arnold's story was fabricated".

White continued experimenting with the Moorman photograph. In the mid-1980s, he produced a new colorized version, enhanced in contrast and brightness, which he claimed revealed the policeman figure in higher clarity. In 1988, White claimed that a man wearing a white shirt and possibly a hard hat is visible behind the Badge Man. He called him the "Back Up Man". (Note: Dale Myers refers to the Back Up Man as Hard Hat Man.) White has also argued that Arnold is visible to the anatomical right of Badge Man.

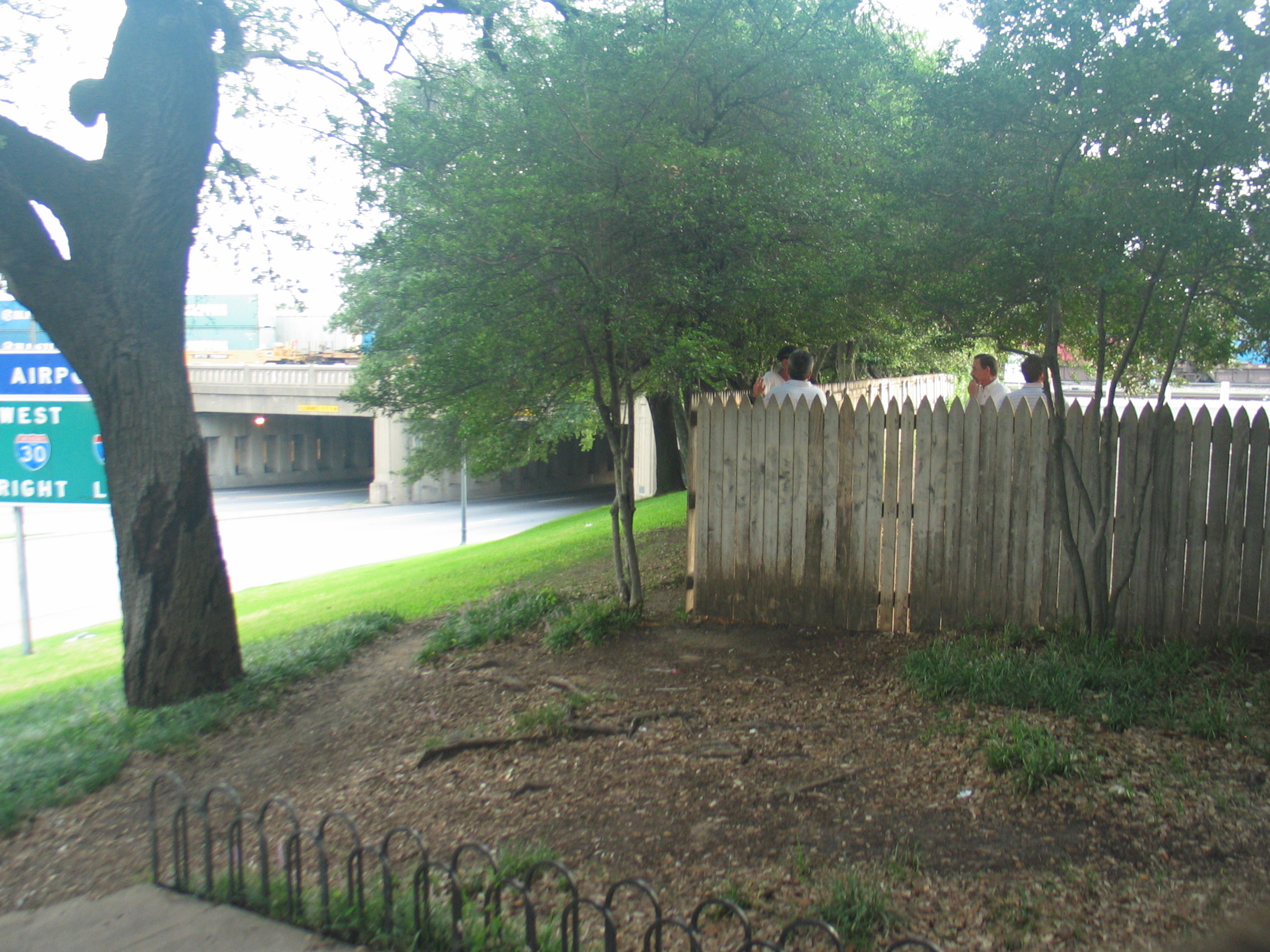
The wooden fence on the grassy knoll, where many conspiracy theorists believe another gunman stood

Many conspiracy theories claim that Kennedy was killed by several shooters positioned throughout Dealey Plaza. The Badge Man is often said to have fired the fatal head shot from the grassy knoll. The 1988 British documentary series The Men Who Killed Kennedy, which features White's work, proposes that the Badge Man was Lucien Sarti, a French national and alleged contract killer. Other conspiracy theorists have suggested that the Badge Man is J. D. Tippit, a Dallas police officer who was killed by Oswald shortly after Kennedy's assassination. Regarding these claims, Mack clarified his stance in 2006: "I've never said that the Badge Man was the knoll assassin, but I have said it's a possibility. That's all."

=== Skepticism ===
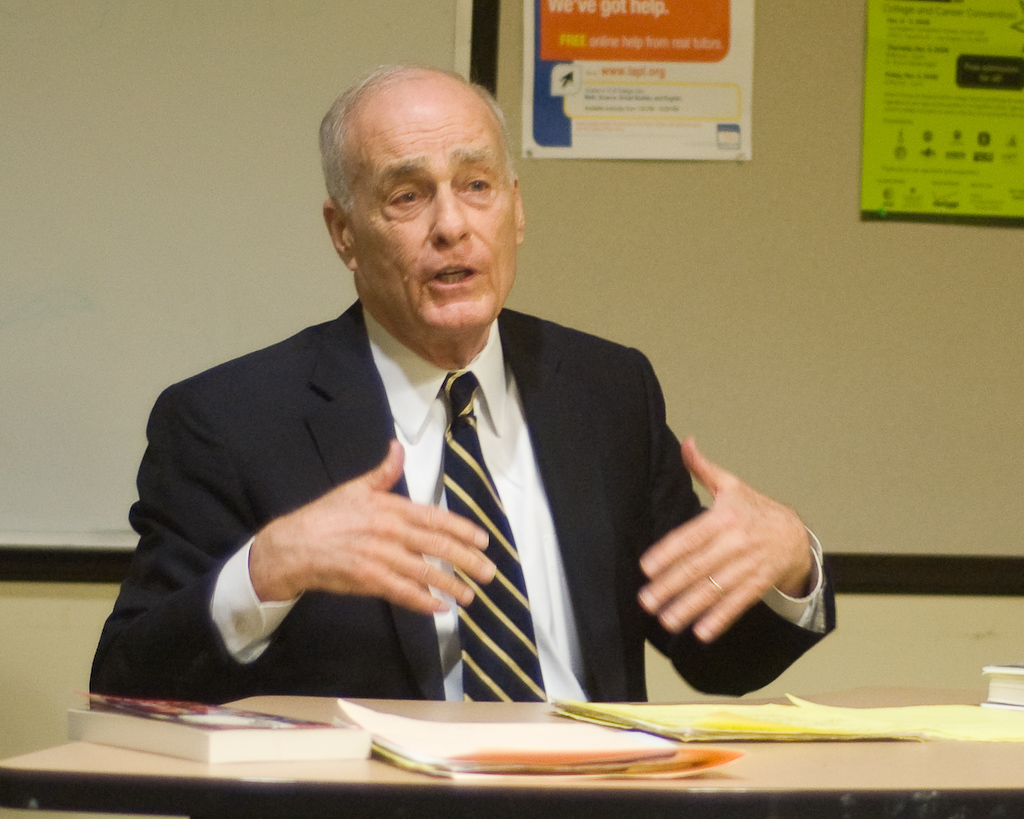
Author and former Los Angeles Deputy District Attorney Vincent Bugliosi dismissed the Badge Man, noting that it does not "benefit from scrutiny".

In an attempt to validate the Badge Man, Mack had the photograph analyzed by third parties, including experts at the Itek Corporation, the Jet Propulsion Laboratory at the California Institute of Technology, and the Massachusetts Institute of Technology. The consensus is that the photograph lacks the resolution to determine whether the Badge Man is a human figure. Photographic expert Geoffrey Crawley concluded that the Badge Man was not a person but rather disparate background elements. (Note: The Men Who Killed Kennedy misrepresents Crawley as having "verified and duplicated" Mack and White's research.)

Bugliosi noted discrepancies with the Badge Man photograph. He argued that the man must have been unusually tall for his badge to be seen above the five-foot-tall (1.5 m) fence, and that his eyes are not near the hypothetical scope of his sniper rifle as would be expected. Bugliosi emphasized that Mack stated he has never confidently identified the presence of a weapon due to the alleged muzzle flash. Mack conceded that the Badge Man has not been identified in any other photographs of the assassination. Furthermore, the Badge Man was not seen by grassy knoll witness Lee Bowers or the nearby Zapruder, and no witness reported seeing a Dallas police officer near where the Badge Man allegedly stood.

Researcher and computer animator Dale Myers has argued that the measurements of the grassy knoll area require the alleged figure to have been in an impossible position to fire a weapon at the motorcade, saying "if [the Badge Man were] truly a human being of average height and build, was located 32 feet [9.8 m] behind the fence line and elevated 4.5 feet [1.4 m] above the ground – an unreasonable and untenable firing position." He states that the retaining wall would have blocked the Badge Man's bullet. Myers has proposed that the Badge Man is merely sunlight reflecting off of a glass bottle. A Coca-Cola bottle is visible in contemporaneous photos resting on a pergola wall near the Badge Man area.

== See also ==
- Babushka Lady
- Black dog man
- Three tramps
- Umbrella man

== Notes and references ==
=== Works cited ===
- Bugliosi, Vincent (2007). Reclaiming History. W. W. Norton & Co. ISBN 978-0-393-04525-3.
- House Select Committee on Assassinations Final Assassination Report – Appendix to Hearings (Report). Vol. VI. United States Government Printing Office. 1979.
- Hearings Before the President's Commission on the Assassination of President Kennedy. Warren Commission Hearings (Report). Vol. VI. United States Government Printing Office. 1964.
- McAdams, John (2011). JFK Assassination Logic: How to Think About Claims of Conspiracy. Potomac Books. ISBN 978-1-59797-489-9.
- Report of the President's Commission on the Assassination of President John F. Kennedy (Report). United States Government Printing Office. 1964.
- Sabato, Larry J. (2014). "Echoes from Dealey Plaza". The Kennedy Half-Century: The Presidency, Assassination, and Lasting Legacy of John F. Kennedy. New York: Bloomsbury. p. 154. ISBN 978-1-62040-282-5.
