= Lee Bowers =

Eyewitness to President Kennedy assassination (1925–1966)

- Born: Lee Edward Bowers Jr. January 12, 1925; Dallas, Texas, US
- Died: August 9, 1966 (aged 41); Midlothian, Texas, US
- Education: Hardin-Simmons University; Southern Methodist University
- Occupations: Railroad switchman, builder, business manager
- Known for: JFK assassination witness

Lee Edward Bowers Jr. (January 12, 1925 – August 9, 1966) was an American railroad employee who was a witness to the assassination of President John F. Kennedy in Dallas, Texas on November 22, 1963. Bowers' testimony to the Warren Commission, and his subsequent interview comments, differed in certain aspects from the official conclusion that all shots were fired by Lee Harvey Oswald from the Texas School Book Depository building. The circumstances of Bowers' death in a car accident in 1966 led to allegations that his demise was part of a cover-up of the Kennedy murder.

== Early life and career ==
Bowers was born in Dallas and spent most of his life there. After serving in the U.S. Navy from ages 17 to 21, he attended Hardin-Simmons University for two years, then Southern Methodist University for two years where he majored in religion. He worked at the Union Terminal Company railyard for 15 years, while also earning extra money as a self-employed builder. In 1964, he was hired as business manager for a hospital and convalescent home.

== Eyewitness to JFK assassination ==
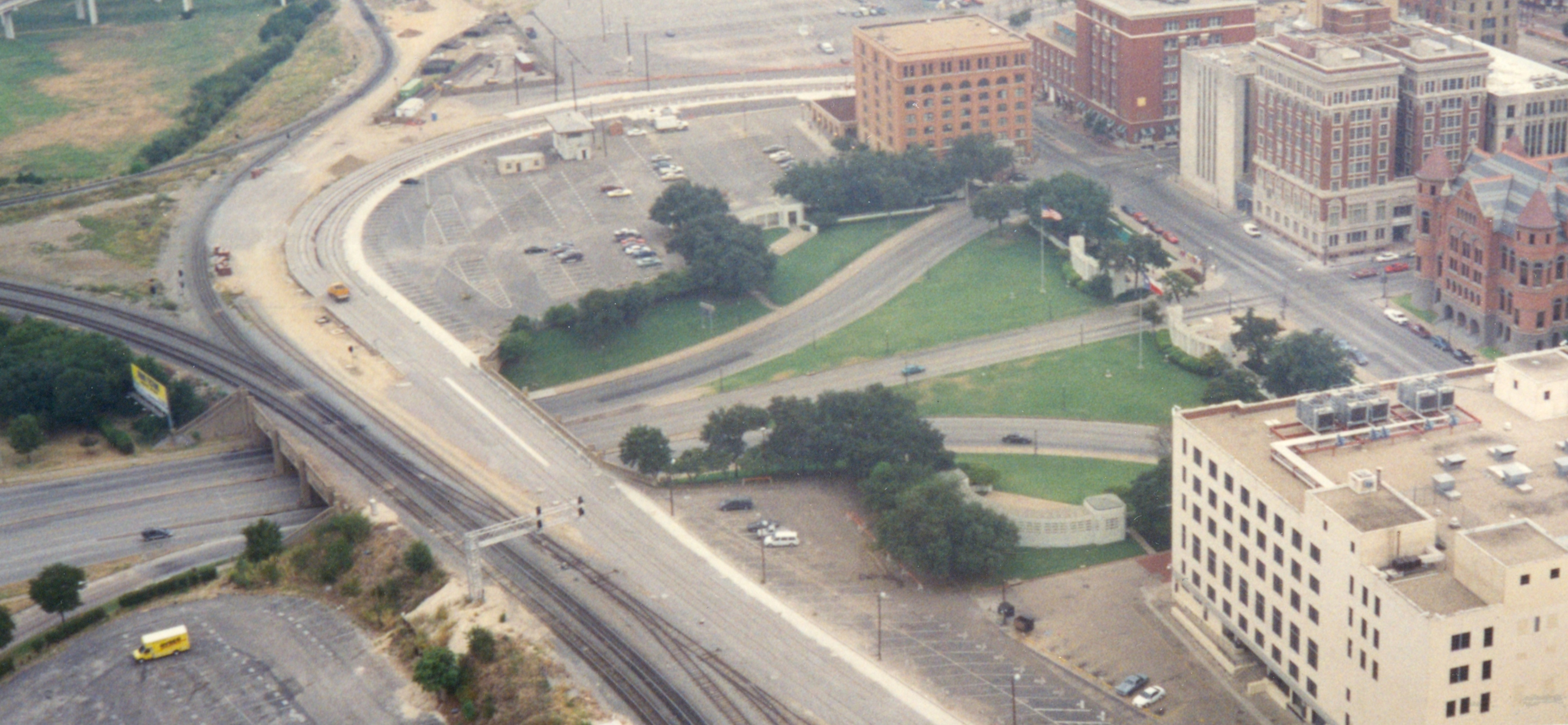
Bowers worked in the gray two-story railroad tower seen nearly alone at the center-top of this photo of Dealey Plaza in Dallas

On the day of the JFK assassination, Bowers was a railroad switchman working in the Union Terminal Company's two-story interlocking tower. It overlooked a small parking lot for railroad employees that was located north of the grassy knoll and approximately 50 yards west of the Texas School Book Depository (TSBD). From his elevated vantage point, Bowers had an unobstructed view of the rear of the concrete pergola, as well as of the stockade fence and the cluster of trees at the top of the grassy knoll incline.

=== Warren Commission testimony ===
On April 2, 1964, Bowers provided testimony to Joseph A. Ball, assistant counsel of the Warren Commission (WC), at the US Post Office Building in Dallas. After giving brief autobiographic information and a history of his employment with Union Terminal, Bowers recalled his observations on November 22. He said that after 10:00 am, the area near the tower was devoid of activity because, in preparation for the presidential motorcade, traffic in the vicinity had been blocked off. This made it easier for Bowers to notice three cars which separately entered the railroad employee parking lot during a time span roughly 20-30 minutes before the shooting started at 12:30 pm. Each car drove slowly around the parking lot. Two cars had out-of-state license plates and "Goldwater for '64" bumper stickers; one car was muddy up to its windows, while another had a white male driver who was speaking into a "mike or telephone" of some kind: "He was holding something up to his mouth with one hand and he was driving with the other".

Bowers also spotted (and this portion of his testimony would later be a source of contention) two men standing near the stockade fence just before the shots were fired. When asked by Ball, "Now, were there any people standing on the...high ground between your tower and where Elm Street goes down under the underpass toward the mouth of the underpass?", Bowers said that when the motorcade went by on Elm Street, four men were in the area: one or two uniformed parking lot attendants, one of whom Bowers knew, and two men standing 10 to 15 feet (3 to 5 m) apart near the Triple Underpass. These two men were unknown to Bowers, and "gave no appearance of being together". One was "middle-aged, or slightly older, fairly heavy-set, in a white shirt, fairly dark trousers" and the other was a "younger man, about midtwenties, in either a plaid shirt or plaid coat or jacket."

When the assassination began, Bowers heard three shots that came either from the TSBD on his left, or from near the Triple Underpass on his right; he was unsure of the origin because of the reverberation from the shots. He added that he sensed a "commotion" of some kind had occurred at the top of the grassy knoll. In his 1966 book Rush to Judgment, Mark Lane called attention to this exchange in which Bowers attempts to explain his visual impressions during the shooting:

Bowers: (...) something occurred in this particular spot which was out of the ordinary, which attracted my eye for some reason, which I could not identify.
Ball: You couldn't describe it?
Bowers: Nothing that I could pinpoint as having happened that—
Ball: Afterwards did a good many people come up there on this high ground at the tower?

In Lane's interpretation, Ball interrupted Bowers with a tangential question in order to steer the discussion away from any possible suggestion of a non-Oswald shooter.

Bowers concluded his testimony by recounting what he saw in the first minutes after the shooting, how a crowd of bystanders and policemen (he estimated as many as 100 people) rushed to the top of the grassy knoll. He said one policeman immediately drove his motorcycle partway up the grassy knoll incline and then jumped off to search behind the stockade fence and trees. Asked if the two men were still there when the motorcycle policeman arrived on the scene, Bowers replied:

[A]s far as I know, one of them was. The other I could not say. The darker dressed man was too hard to distinguish from the trees. The one in the white shirt, yes; I think he was.

In a final exchange, Ball alluded to a pre-deposition conversation he had had with Bowers, as well as to the current testimony, and inquired: "You have told me all that you know about this, haven't you?" Bowers answered: "Yes, I believe that I have related everything which I have told the city police, and also told to the FBI."

=== Later interview comments ===
In March 1966, when Bowers was interviewed by Mark Lane for the Emile de Antonio-directed documentary film Rush to Judgment, Lane requested that Bowers elaborate on his recollection of the "out of the ordinary" incident that attracted his eye during the shooting. Bowers responded by saying that as the motorcade passed, there was "a flash of light or smoke or something which caused me to feel like something out of the ordinary had occurred there."

Bowers also stated that of the two unidentified men he saw standing in the area, neither was dressed like a railroad employee or police officer: "These two men were the only two strangers in the area. The others were workers whom I knew."

Lane, from his perspective as a trial lawyer, labeled Bowers an "impressive" witness: "His wry sense of humor and his excellent memory made him perhaps the finest witness I have ever questioned."

=== Controversy over Bowers' testimony ===
Besides Lane, other WC critics seized on what they considered the vital importance of Bowers' observations, including the cars circling the parking lot, the two unfamiliar men milling about the area, the "flash of light" during the shooting, and the rush of people to the top of the grassy knoll. In Crossfire: The Plot That Killed Kennedy (1989), Jim Marrs wrote: "Bowers told a fascinating story of suspicious cars moving in the sealed-off railroad yards minutes before the assassination, and of seeing strange men behind the picket fence." Gary Mack offered a similar interpretation of Bowers' testimony in the documentary series, The Men Who Killed Kennedy, that first aired on British TV. In Not in Your Lifetime (1990), Anthony Summers wrote: "Lee Bowers, the railway towerman who had seen two strangers behind the fence just before the assassination, had partially lost sight of them in the foliage." In their book High Treason: The Assassination of JFK and the Case for Conspiracy (1998), Harrison Edward Livingstone and Robert J. Groden said that Bowers "was in the railroad control behind the grassy knoll and saw two men behind the fence, a puff of smoke during the shooting, and a lot of activity."

In 2004, WC defender Dale K. Myers argued that Bowers' comments about the two men were falsely characterized by conspiracy theorists, who implied that Bowers saw two assassins standing behind the stockade fence at the time of the shooting. Myers wrote that a closer study of Bowers' remarks indicated he was only referring to two men he saw standing near the fence, not behind the fence. Myers' point was reiterated by David Reitzes on his "JFK 100" website. They both emphasized how this aspect of Bowers' testimony was distorted by Mark Lane, Gary Mack, Oliver Stone and others in order to bolster the theory of shots coming from behind the stockade fence.

Myers also attacked what he viewed as key omissions in the Rush to Judgment documentary. Bowers made additional clarifying comments in the interview—which Lane and de Antonio chose to exclude from the finished film—that the two men at the top of the grassy knoll incline were standing in the opening between the concrete pergola and the stockade fence, and that Bowers saw "no one" behind the fence when the shots were fired. Citing a transcript of the full taped interview with Bowers, Myers highlighted the following passages:

"These two men were standing back from the street somewhat at the top of the incline and were very near two trees which were in the area. And one of them, from time to time as he walked back and forth, disappeared behind a wooden fence which is also slightly to the west of that. These two men to the best of my knowledge were standing there at the time of the shooting.... Now I could see back or the South side of the wooden fence in the area, so that obviously that there was no one there who could have - uh - had anything to do with either - as accomplice or anything else because there was no one there - um - at the moment that the shots were fired."

Myers further argued that since Bowers saw no one behind the fence, he disproved conspiracists' allegations of a "Badge Man" shooting from that location.

In Reclaiming History (2007), Vincent Bugliosi wrote, "Bowers did not indicate that he saw anything suspicious or out of the ordinary with these two men", and that "inept questioning by Warren Commission counsel failed to establish just where these men were." Bugliosi also cast doubt on Lane's ability to elicit more details from Bowers in the 1966 interview for the Rush to Judgment film, sarcastically calling Bowers "a poster child for recovered memory".

== Death ==
On August 9, 1966, Lee Bowers died when his car drifted off a highway, while traveling at an estimated speed of 50 miles per hour, and struck a concrete bridge abutment near Midlothian, Texas. He was 41 years old. Critics of the Warren Commission labeled it one of many suspicious deaths of JFK assassination witnesses whose testimony differed from the official narrative.

At the end of the Rush to Judgment film, following the Bowers interview and after journalist Penn Jones Jr. tells Mark Lane about the "strange" deaths of multiple JFK assassination witnesses, the film displays a postscript: "Three months after our interview, L. E. Bowers, Jr. was killed in an accident." In his book Forgive My Grief II (1967), Jones claimed that Bowers "had been receiving death threats and had taken out a large insurance policy before he was killed". Regarding speculation that Bowers may have fallen asleep or suffered a heart attack while driving, Jones wrote, "The doctor from Midlothian who attended Bowers stated that he did not have a heart attack and that he thought Bowers was in some sort of 'strange shock.'" Other assassination researchers, however, have disputed the notion that there was foul play involved in the car accident.

== Portrayals ==
Bowers was portrayed by Pruitt Taylor Vince in the 1991 film JFK.
