= Dale Myers =

Dale Myers may refer to:

- Dale K. Myers (born 1955), John F. Kennedy assassination researcher
- Dale D. Myers (1922–2015), Deputy Administrator of NASA
