= Umbrella man (JFK assassination) =

Man present at the JFK assassination

- Witt in 1963
- Born: Louie Steven Witt; October 20, 1924; Rockwall, Texas, U.S.
- Died: November 17, 2014 (aged 90); Dallas, Texas, U.S.
- Employer: Rio Grande National Life Insurance Company
- Known for: Witness to John F. Kennedy's assassination

The "umbrella man", later identified as Louie Steven Witt (October 20, 1924 – November 17, 2014), is a figure who appears in several films and photographs of the assassination of United States President John F. Kennedy. He was one of the closest bystanders when the President was first struck by a bullet near the Stemmons Freeway sign within Dealey Plaza. The figure's behavior raised suspicion among investigators due to his maneuvering of an umbrella as Kennedy was passing him despite clear skies.

Louie Steven Witt came forward to the United States House Select Committee on Assassinations in 1978, identifying himself as the "umbrella man" in the footage. Witt said that he brought the umbrella that day to heckle Kennedy as an indirect reference to Joseph P. Kennedy Sr.'s support of Neville Chamberlain.

== Speculation ==
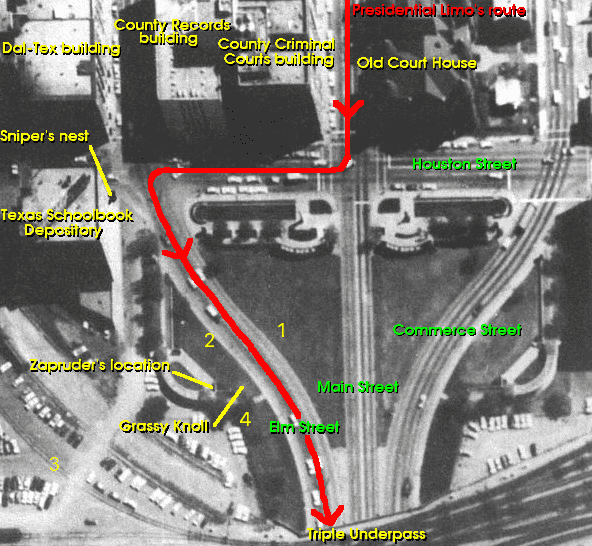
1. Babushka lady, 2. Umbrella man (Louie Witt) 3. Three tramps, 4. Badge man. Photo of Dealey Plaza (annotated), from Warren Commission report. North to the almost direct left.

A person popularly dubbed the "umbrella man" has been the object of much speculation, as he was the only person seen carrying, and opening, an umbrella on that sunny day. He was also one of the closest bystanders to President John F. Kennedy when Kennedy was first struck by a bullet. As Kennedy's limousine approached, the man opened up and lifted the umbrella high above his head, then spun or panned the umbrella from east to west (clockwise) as the president passed by him.

In the aftermath of the assassination, the "umbrella man" sat down on the sidewalk next to another man ("Dark Complected Man") before getting up and walking towards the Texas School Book Depository. The fact that both of the men sat there so calmly after the shooting has raised suspicion.

Early speculation came from assassination researchers Josiah Thompson and Richard Sprague, who noticed the open umbrella in a series of photographs. Thompson and Sprague suggested that the "umbrella man" may have been acting as a signaler of some kind, opening his umbrella to signal "go ahead", and then raising it to communicate "fire a second round" to other gunmen. The "umbrella man" is depicted as performing such a role in Oliver Stone's film JFK and The X-Files episode "Musings of a Cigarette Smoking Man." Another theory proposed by conspiracy theorist Robert B. Cutler and endorsed by Colonel L. Fletcher Prouty is that the umbrella may have been used to fire a dart with a paralyzing agent at Kennedy to immobilize his muscles and make him a "sitting duck" for an assassination.

Journalist Penn Jones Jr. was approached by someone who mentioned the name of Louie Steven Witt. When he was tracked down, he barely wanted to interact with journalists but offered to testify before the United States House Select Committee on Assassinations (HSCA). His statement of only holding up the umbrella did not reflect what he actually did at that moment, as he was moving the umbrella during the moment of shooting. An idea speculated by the HSCA is that the umbrella may have been held as a symbol of protest regarding the U.S. government's failure to provide an "umbrella" of air support during the Bay of Pigs invasion.

== Identification ==
After an appeal to the public by the HSCA, Louie Steven Witt came forward in 1978 and claimed to be the "umbrella man". He claimed to still have the umbrella and did not know he had been the subject of controversy. He said that he brought the umbrella simply to heckle Kennedy, whose father, Joseph, had been a supporter of the Nazi-appeasing British Prime Minister Neville Chamberlain. By waving a black umbrella, Chamberlain's trademark fashion accessory, Witt said that he was protesting the Kennedy family appeasing Adolf Hitler before World War II. An umbrella had been used in cartoons in the 1930s to symbolize such appeasement, and Chamberlain often carried an umbrella. Critics of Chamberlain used open umbrellas as a protest tactic, which was then adopted by conservative Americans in the 1950s and 60s who perceived certain politicians to be "appeasing the enemies of the United States".

Kennedy, who wrote a thesis on appeasement while at Harvard, Why England Slept, might have recognized the symbolism of the umbrella. Black umbrellas had been used in connection with protests against the President before. At the time of the construction of the Berlin Wall, a group of schoolchildren from Bonn sent the White House an umbrella labeled Chamberlain.

Testifying before the HSCA, Witt said "I think if The Guinness Book of World Records had a category for people who were in the wrong place at the wrong time doing the wrong thing, I would be No. 1 in that position without even a close runner-up."

=== Death ===
Witt died on November 17, 2014.

== See also ==
- Babushka Lady
- Badge Man
- Black dog man
- Three tramps
