= Fred Crisman =

American pilot (1919–1975)

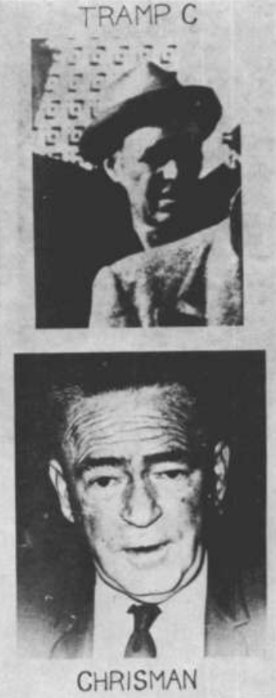
In an exhibit of the Committee on Assassinations, one of the three tramps photographed near Dealey Plaza on the day of the John F. Kennedy assassination is compared to Fred Crisman (bottom)

Fred Lee Crisman (July 22, 1919 – December 10, 1975) was an American fighter pilot and educator from Tacoma, Washington, known for claims of paranormal events and ties to 20th century conspiracies.

In 1946, Crisman claimed to have battled with "mysterious and evil" underground creatures in caves during the Second World War. The following year, he attempted to convince two early flying saucer witnesses that lava rocks were in fact debris dropped from a flying saucer. In 1968, Crisman was subpoenaed by a New Orleans grand jury in the prosecution of a local man for the assassination of President John F. Kennedy—a prosecution that would later be dramatized in the 1991 Oliver Stone film JFK.

Conspiracy authors consider Crisman "a nexus point for a number of conspiracies and cover-ups from the late 1940s until [his] death in 1975".

== Early life ==
Fred Crisman
- Born: July 22, 1919
- Died: December 10, 1975 (aged 56); Seattle, Washington
- Other name: Jon Gold
- Occupations: Pilot, radio talk show host, author
- Known for: Role in UFO conspiracy theories and John F. Kennedy assassination conspiracy theories
- Notable work: Murder of a City

Crisman was born on July 22, 1919, the only child of Fred M. Crisman and wife Eva (born Eva Pitchers, died Eva White, 1971). In 1933, he and his family moved to Vale, Oregon; His father ran a hotel there.

In 1939, Crisman graduated from Vale Union High School. After attending Eastern Oregon College during 1939–40, Crisman left, working as a brakeman for the Union Pacific Railroad.

== Military career ==
On May 26, 1942, Crisman enlisted in the Army, entering the service with the rank of second lieutenant. In 1943, Crisman was listed an aviation cadet undergoing training at Lancaster, California. He was awarded the Air Medal and the Distinguished Flying Cross. Crisman left the Army as a First Lieutenant on February 19, 1946.

== Veterans advocate ==
In April 1946, Crisman served as representative of the Washington state bureau of veterans' affairs when he called for safety inspections of some used cars. That month, Crisman filed to run for coroner. In May, Crisman addressed the Tacoma Real Estate board in the Hotel Winthrop about veterans' real estate problems. In August 1946, Crisman, then described as the head of the state department of veterans' affairs, addressed the Seattle American Veterans chapter. Later that month, he addressed the Lions Club. On November 5, Crisman lent his name to an ad endorsing Hugh J. Rosellini for prosecutor. In November 1946, Crisman, then described as a special investigator for the bureau, gave a speech about mental illness in returning servicemen to the Kiwanis club at the Hotel Winthrop. In December 1946, Crisman was elected to represent Washington members of veterans organization AMVETS at an upcoming session.

== Relationship with Ray Palmer and Amazing Stories ==
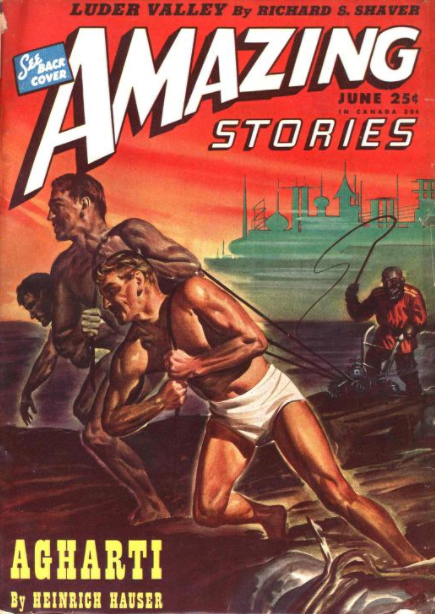
Crisman's claims of firsthand knowledge of the Shaver Mystery were published in June 1946.

In 1946–47, pulp magazine Amazing Stories was an outlet for fantasy, science-fiction, and fringe claims. The May 1946 issue, for example, included purportedly-true fringe adventures by Richard Sharpe Shaver, the fiction of Dorothy & John de Courcy written in the style of Shaver, a defense of the religions of Tibet by Millen Cooke, the fiction of Robert Moore Williams, an allegedly-true eyewitness account of unidentified objects in the skies by Dirk Wylie, and other genre-blurring texts.

=== Promotion of the Shaver mystery ===
In June 1946, Amazing Stories published a pseudonymous letter by Crisman in which he claimed to have battled "mysterious and evil" underground creatures to free himself from a cave in what is now northern Pakistan during World War II. Wrote Crisman:

I flew my last combat mission on May 26 [1945] when I was shot up over Bassein and ditched my ship in Ramaree Roads off Chedubs Island. I was missing five days. I requested leave at Kashmere. I and Capt. (deleted by request) left Srinagar and went to Rudok then through the Khesa pass to the northern foothills of the Kabakoram. We found what we were looking for. We knew what we were searching for.

For heaven's sake, drop the whole thing! You are playing with dynamite. My companion and I fought our way out of a cave with submachine guns. I have two 9" scars on my left arm that came from wounds given me in the cave when I was 50 feet from a moving object of any kind and in perfect silence. The muscles were nearly ripped out. How? I don't know. My friend has a hole the size of a dime in his right bicep. It was seared inside. How we don't know. But we both believe we know more about the Shaver Mystery than any other pair. You can imagine my fright when I picked up my first copy of Amazing Stories and see you splashing words about the subject.

Do not print our names, we are not cowards, but we are not crazy.

The letter was quoted in the September 1946 issue of Harper's Magazine as an example of a crackpot letter. In May 1947, Amazing Stories published a second Crisman letter, this time identifying him by name. In this letter, Crisman claimed to have traveled to Alaska with his friend Dick, who was killed there.

=== Role in Maury Island incident ===
In 1947, Crisman was involved with Harold Dahl in the Maury Island incident, an early UFO incident widely considered to be a hoax, even within Ufology. Dahl believed the 1960s TV series, The Invaders was based on Crisman's life.

In the January 1950 issue of Fate Magazine, Crisman insisted the incident was not a hoax. Wrote Crisman: "Why, if we were such blackguards and deliberately caused the deaths of two Air Force Pilots and the loss of a $150,000 airplane did not the government or some agency there attempt to seek justice through the courts of the state and federal government".

On July 22, 1967, Crisman spoke at a UFO convention in Seattle about the Maury Island incident.

== University student ==
In Fall 1947, Crisman participated in college community theater in La Grande. In April 1949, Crisman was listed as acting public relations officer of Oregon's first chapter of AMVETS. In summer 1949, Crisman gave talk on "The Far East" to a Kiwanis Club. In February 1950, a letter by Crisman was entered into the congressional record. Wrote Crisman: "China has fallen to the Reds [...] Indo-china is on the verge and will go soon." Crisman continued "It makes me mad to see it all go, while people I thought were in the 'know' grovel and back up before a gang of international brigands whose only difference from the Nazis is the cut of their uniforms. I no longer think the people guiding our state department know just what they are doing...".

In September 1950, Crisman was a Willamette University student. In October 1950, he wrote a letter to the editor complaining about the inability of local barbers to give a military trim. In 1951, while studying at Willamette University, Crisman received a teaching assignment at Salem High. On June 10, 1951, Crisman was awarded a Bachelor's of Arts.

== Return to the military ==
Amid the Korean War, in April 1951, it was reported that Crisman had been ordered to active duty. That conflict ended in July 1953.

== Teaching career ==
In 1953, he returned to teaching in Elgin, Oregon. He worked as a teacher and administrator in high schools in Washington and Oregon.

In December 1953, Crisman served as director of the high school drama club. In 1955, Crisman accepted a job as superintendent at Huntington. On April 15, 1957, Crisman was charged with being drunk and disorderly, resisting arrest, and pulling a firearm on the arresting officer; he was fined $100.

In 1958, Crisman was cited in connection with a local tradition of a fictional high school student at White River High. Also in 1958, Crisman took a course at Pacific Lutheran University. In 1959, Crisman organized a fundraising project that sold booklets about the varsity basketball team. In 1960, Crisman's civics class authored a letter to the editor on the Caryl Chessman death penalty case, arguing "Has the time come when the United States takes orders from other countries? The Chessman case is a problem which is testing the judicial stability of the United States. The exterior infiltration on the United States and the exterior infiltration of the State of California should not force our government to bow down to the opinions of other nations and countries." Crisman resigned from White River High in June 1960.

By 1962, Crisman was attached to Rainer High School. In 1964, Crisman began teaching in the Turner school district, and it was reported his book on "Industrial Recruiting" had been accepted for publication. In April 1965, his post was listed as journalism teacher. On February 21, 1966, Crisman was suspended and later dismissed from his teaching position at Cascade High on a charge of insubordination and "creating a secret society". The board added that "the organization is of such a nature that should not be condoned or authorized to exist in this district." District officials said the society had been limited to five students, and officials declined to disclose the nature of the organization.

== Business and politics ==
In 1966, an FBI informant claimed that Crisman had transported $100,000 in cash to California, was doing business as a psychologist, and was suspected of operating a diploma mill. In July 1966, Fate Magazine ran an ad for the "Western Division of the Parapsychological Society" inviting new members to join by contacting "F. Lee Crisman, PhD". In November 1966, Crisman founded The Professional Research Bureau, with T. Edward Beckham and Searoba Bates, seeking "to conduct research and consultation within the fields of penology research and industrial psychology, public relations and criminology".

== Role in the Clay Shaw trial ==
On March 1, 1967, New Orleans businessman Clay Shaw was arrested for conspiring to assassinate John Kennedy. According to controversial district attorney Jim Garrison, the first person Shaw called after being charged was Fred Crisman. On October 31, 1968, a grand jury in New Orleans issued a subpoena for Fred Lee Crisman in connection with the investigation into the John F. Kennedy assassination. District attorney Jim Garrison issued a press release, writing:

Mr. Crisman has been engaged in undercover activity for a part of the industrial warfare complex for years. His cover is that of a "preacher" and a person "engaged in work to help gypsies."

Our information indicates that since the early 1960s he has made many trips to the New Orleans and Dallas areas in connection with his undercover work for that part of the warfare industry engaged in the manufacture of what is termed, in military language, a "hardware"—meaning those weapons sold to the U.S. government which are uniquely large and expensive.

Mr. Crisman is a "former" employee of the Boeing Aircraft Company in the sense that one defendant in the case is a "former" employee of Lockheed Aircraft Company in Los Angeles. In intelligence terminology this ordinarily means that the connection still exists but that the "former employee" has moved into an underground operation. More often than not a "bad record" or evidence indicating that he has been "fired" is prepared for the parent company to increase the disassociation between the two.

That same day, Crisman was arrested by Tacoma police for reckless driving.

On November 21, 1968, Crisman was deposed in the case against Clay Shaw. By January 9, 1969, Kennedy assassination conspiracy theorist Richard E. Sprague was privately accusing Crisman of being one of the three tramps.

== Broadcasting and politics ==
Starting on August 1, 1968, Crisman hosted a radio talk show under the pseudonym "Jon Gold" on station KAYE. Crismann authored a pamphlet, under his radio name Jon Gold, titled "What to do until Sanity Returns" which he advertised on his show. The work denounced sensitivity training as "Communist-oriented" brainwashing. Crisman's pamphlet called for widespread infiltration and disruption of civic organizations like Parent-Teacher Associations. Wrote Crisman:

"You must take a page from the Communist Manifesto... You must learn to halt the elections at P-TA units. Do not stop with school organizations, infiltrate each garden club, suborn its social policy and convert it to an agit-prop group."

In January 1969, Crisman was sued for libel along with other KAYE personalities by a city official who had been accused of being a communist; The case was dismissed.

Crisman authored a book, The Murder of a City, Tacoma published in 1970 through Transistor Publishing Company. The book was described by reviewer Michael Sullivan as a "weird, politically slanted rant" that manages to "tie corruption in Tacoma to everything from communist infiltrators to the Kennedy assassination".

In November 1970, KAYE was the subject of hearings by the FCC amid complaints that the station violated the Fairness Doctrine. Crisman's behavior was the subject of extensive discussion, with one witness arguing his playing of "Nazi war songs" had jeopardized the station's licence. Citizens opposed to KAYE discussed the stations promotion of the antisemitic conspiracy theories and presented transcripts of Crisman making anti-black comments. One listener reported that "she heard a KAYE broadcast of the Jon Gold Show in which reference was made by a caller to getting rid of Rowlands in the manner which President John Kennedy and his brother were disposed of". Crisman resigned from KAYE. Two subpoenas were issued for Crisman to appear before the hearings, but he disappeared and could not be located.

In 1970, Crisman was appointed to the Library Board, despite objections about his false claims of having held a doctorate. Crisman was elected Vice-President of the Tacoma library board. Crisman was named as a possible investor in Tacoma cable television. Local news discussed whether a gun had been allowed inside KAYE.

== Final years ==
Beginning in 1970, a photocopied document called the "Torbitt Document" or "Nomenclature of an Assassination" circulated among Kennedy assassination buffs claimed that Crisman was one of the "three tramps" allegedly employed by a secret government agency. The document incorrectly names him "Chrismon" and falsely claims he was a Syrian immigrant.

In 1971, Crisman ran unsuccessfully for a seat on the civil service board. In 1973, Crisman resigned from the Tacoma Library Board of Directors. Crisman unsuccessfully ran for a seat on the Tacoma City Council. In September 1974, Crisman was hospitalized for kidney failure. On April 12, 1975, Crisman married Mary Frances Borden.

In April 1975, True Magazine published a photo of Crisman, speculating he was one of the "three hobos" of JFK conspiracy lore. The November 1975 issue of Crawdaddy Magazine repeated this claim and further claimed, without evidence, that "Olympia police suspected [Crisman] of narcotics activity in connection with a group called "Servants of Awareness".

Fred Crisman died on December 10, 1975. At his death, it was noted that Crisman was a graduate of Willamette University with degrees in political science, history, and education and psychology.

== Legacy ==
From 1976 to 1985, conspiracy author Richard E. Sprague's fringe book The Taking of America 1-2-3 named Crisman as a grassy knoll shooter.

In 1977, controversial district attorney Jim Garrison claimed that Crisman was one of the "Three Tramps" arrested by Dallas police as well as being a Bishop of the Universal Life Church. Garrison theorized:

"I suggest the only reasonable conclusion is that he [Crisman] was (and probably is, if still around), an operative at a deep cover level in a long-range, clandestine, intelligence mission directly (in terms of our national intelligence paranoia) related to maintaining national security... Crisman emerges as an operative at a supervisory level ... acquired by the apparatus to carry out the menial jobs that are needed to push a current mission forward, a middle man—in the final analysis—between the mechanics who eliminate, and the handy men, who otherwise support a termination mission, on one hand, and the distant, far removed, deep submerged command level on the other."

In 1979, the House Select Committee on Assassinations reported that forensic anthropologists had analyzed and compared the photographs of the "three tramps" with those of Crisman, as well as with photographs of Watergate figures E. Howard Hunt, Frank Sturgis, and two other men. According to the Committee, only Crisman resembled any of the tramps; but the same Committee determined that he was not in Dealey Plaza on the day of the assassination.

A document called The Easy Papers was circulated for decades among conspiracy researchers; The document, bearing the date September 13, 1969, purported to be a service record of Crisman's time as an OSS and later CIA agent.

In 1997, influential conspiracy author Jim Marrs cited the document as proof that Crisman had been a member of the OSS during World War 2; Marrs was criticized for relying on the untrustworthy document. In 1999, conspiracy author Kenn Thomas's book on the Maury Island incident carried the subtitle The Crisman Conspiracy. Conspiracy figure Michael Riconosciuto claims he knew Fred Crisman since Riconosciuto was a child.

=== Animated comedy ===
Fred Crisman: Cave of the Space Nazis is a 2022 animated comedy film based on the tales of Fred Crisman.

Poster for the "Fred Crisman: Cave of the Space Nazis'

Synopsis

The film begins with the disclaimer: "The following events are apparently true, based on the many claims of Fred Lee Crisman. Technically, we can't prove this didn't happen."

The first scene sees Fred Crisman broadcasting from Tacoma radio station KAYE. Crisman tells listeners he was not involved with the Kennedy assassination, saying "I could never have performed such a stunt...", before slyly adding "alone". Crisman claims he has protected the Earth from aliens, saying to doubters "If you don't believe that I protected this world from egregious extraterrestrials, then I simply ask you: Where are they? I don't see any aliens here. You're welcome!"

In flashback to 1946, the film introduces Raymond Palmer, the editor of Unbelievable Tales Magazine, as Crisman recounts an adventurous story of being shot down over the Bay of Bengal during the Second World War. Making his way to Cheduba Island, Crisman seeks shelter in a cave, where he discovers the dead bodies of soldiers. Venturing further into the cave, Crisman discovered the cave is inhabited by the Deros, evil monsters who believe themselves to be the true superior race of the Earth. When Crisman witnesses the Deros torture a victim, he pulls out a pistol, firing it while screaming "Die, you Space Nazi Monsters!".

Crisman is wounded in the firefight, receiving a scar on his shoulder (Palmer notes that medical records indicate scar was present when Crisman first enlisted, but Crisman dismisses this as a Deros forgery). Killing many of the enemy, Crisman escapes and lives to tell the tale.

Cast

- Brock Baker as Richard Shaver
- Pat Cashman as Fred Crisman
- Gabriella Castro as Radio Jingle Singer
- Alec Crisman as Radio Announcer
- Meghan Nigrelli as The Computer
- Hellbent as Dero Victim
- Bryan Shickley as The Deros
- Nathaniel Williams as Raymond Palmer

Reception

Promotional material described the film emerging after "a group of talented folks asked the question 'Why hasn't Fred Crisman had a movie yet?'"

The film premiered on August 4, 2022, at Gen Con Film Festival, where it garnered the award for Best Comedy. Director Bryan Shickley told reporters: "I love the utter outrageousness that is Fred Lee Crisman, and no matter how you feel about his claims, you just can't come away from spending time with Crisman without forming strong feelings about him."

The film was an official selection of the Brooklyn SciFi Film Festival.

== See also ==
- UFO reports and disinformation
