= Mary Moorman =

Woman who captured a picture of the 1963 JFK assassination (born 1932)

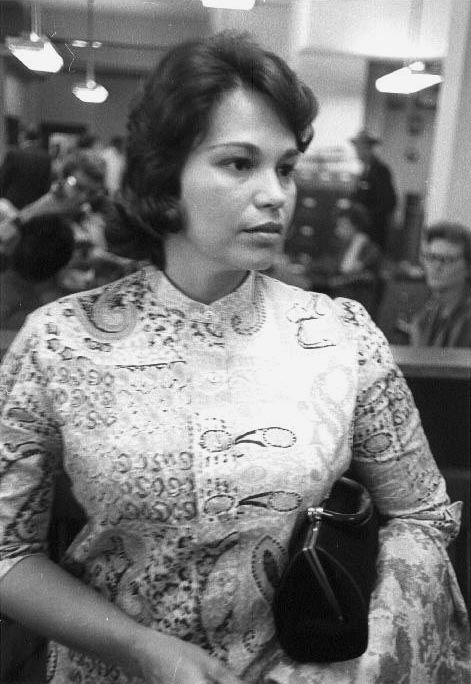
- Mary Moorman in the Dallas County Sheriff's office on the evening of the assassination
- Born: Mary Ann Boshart; August 5, 1932
- Spouse(s): Donald G. Moorman (m. 1952; div. 1973) Gary Krahmer (m. 1980)
- Children: 1

Mary Ann Moorman (née Boshart; born August 5, 1932) is an American woman who chanced to photograph US president John F. Kennedy a fraction of a second after he was fatally shot in the head in Dallas, Texas. A figure referred to as the Badge Man, whom conspiracy theorists claim to be one of Kennedy's assassins, is purportedly visible in another of her photographs taken that day.

== Biography ==
Mary Ann Moorman was born Mary Ann Boshart. She married Donald G. Moorman in 1952 and divorced him in 1973. She later married Gary Krahmer in 1980.

== Assassination witness ==
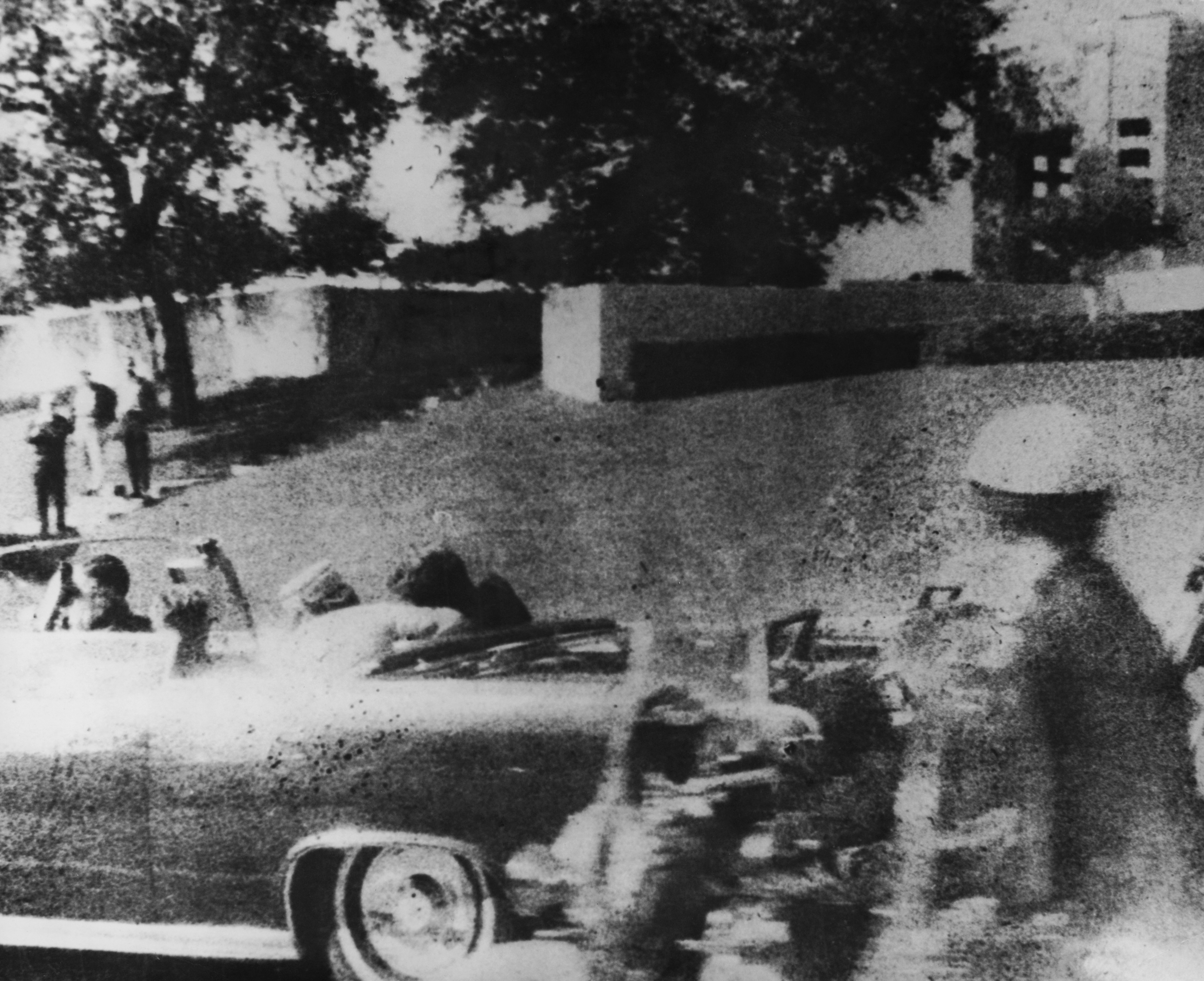
The Polaroid photo taken by Mary Ann Moorman a fraction of a second after the fatal shot (detail)

On November 22, 1963, U.S. president John F. Kennedy was assassinated in Dallas, Texas.

Moorman stated that her 11-year-old son (Richard Don Moorman, 1952–2003) had wanted to see Kennedy, but was unable to attend because of school. She said she promised to take a picture for him.

Moorman was standing on grass about 2 feet (61 cm) south of the south curb of Elm Street in Dealey Plaza, directly across from the grassy knoll and the North Pergola concrete structure that Abraham Zapruder and his assistant Marilyn Sitzman were standing on – during the assassination. Moorman stated that she stepped off the grass onto the street to take a photo with her Polaroid camera. Zapruder can be seen standing on the pergola in the Moorman photograph, with the presidential limousine already having passed through the line of sight between Zapruder and Moorman.

Both Moorman and her friend, Jean Hill, can be clearly seen in the Zapruder film. Between Zapruder frames 315 and 316, Moorman took a Polaroid photograph, her fifth that day, showing the presidential limousine with the grassy knoll area in the background.

Moorman's photograph captured the fatal headshot that killed President Kennedy. When she took it – approximately one-sixth of a second after President Kennedy was struck in the head at Zapruder frame 313, Moorman was standing behind and to the left of President Kennedy, about 15 feet (5 m) from the presidential limousine. Moorman said in a TV interview that immediately after the assassination, there were three or four shots close together, that shots were still being fired after the fatal headshot, and that she was in the line of fire. She later stated in a 2013 PBS documentary Kennedy Half Century that she was close enough to hear Jackie Kennedy exclaim that John had been shot.

Moorman was interviewed for the 1967 Mark Lane documentary Rush to Judgment. In 1969 she testified at the trial of Clay Shaw. In 1988 she appeared in the documentary The Men Who Killed Kennedy. She is portrayed by Sally Nystuen in Oliver Stone's 1991 film JFK. In 2013, Moorman attempted to sell the original Polaroid through Cowan's Auctions in Cincinnati. The photo was expected to sell for between $50,000 and $75,000, but did not meet its reserve. Moorman had previously tried selling the photo to Sotheby's in New York, but the auction house deemed it to be "too sensitive to auction". That same year, she expressed her opinion on the assassination; she was convinced that Kennedy was killed as a result of a conspiracy. "I really don't know what exactly happened, but I do know there is bound to be a lot more to the story that hasn't been told," she said. "I was hoping it would come out in my lifetime, but who knows. So much has been hidden by the government; anything can take place and it can be hidden. Oswald probably wasn't a lone person, he probably had backers. I really do think it was a conspiracy".

=== Controversy ===
Whatever was captured in the background of Moorman's photo has been a matter of contentious debate. On the grassy knoll, some have claimed to identify as many as four different human figures, while others dismiss these indistinct images as either trees or shadows. Most often, one figure has been dubbed the "Badge Man" as it seems to resemble a uniformed police officer wearing a badge. Others claim to see Gordon Arnold, a man who claimed to have filmed the assassination from that area, a man in a construction hard hat, and a hatted man behind the stockade fence.

Moorman stated she heard a shot as the limousine passed her, then heard another two shots, "pow pow", when the president's head exploded. She stated that she could not determine where the shots came from, and that she saw no one in the area that appeared to have possibly been the assassin. Moorman was interviewed by the Dallas County Sheriff's Department and the FBI. She was called by the Warren Commission to testify, but due to a sprained ankle, she was unable to be questioned. She was never contacted by them again.
