= John F. Kennedy assassination Dictabelt recording =

Audio recording related to the assassination of John F. Kennedy

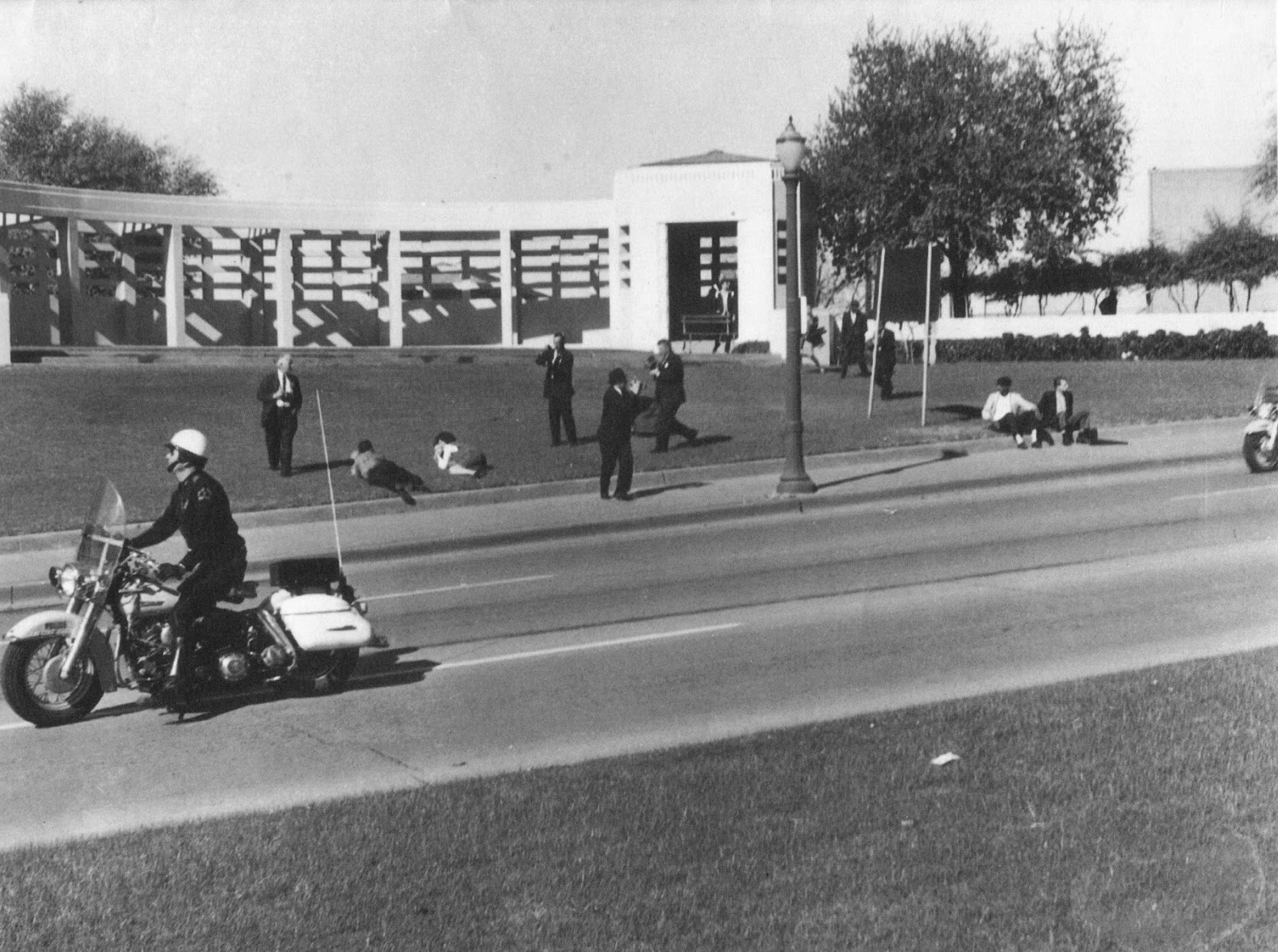
Dealey Plaza in the immediate aftermath of the assassination

A Dictabelt recording from a motorcycle police officer's radio microphone stuck in the open position became a key piece of evidence cited by the House Select Committee on Assassinations (HSCA) in their conclusion that there was a conspiracy behind the assassination of John F. Kennedy on November 22, 1963. Made on a common Dictaphone-brand dictation machine that recorded sound in grooves pressed into a thin vinyl-plastic belt, the recording gained prominence among Kennedy assassination conspiracy theorists following the HSCA's 1978 conclusion, based in part on this evidence, that there was a "high probability" that Lee Harvey Oswald did not act alone and that the Kennedy assassination was the result of a conspiracy.

The recording was made from Dallas Police Radio Channel 1, which carried routine police radio traffic. Channel 2 was reserved for special events such as the presidential motorcade. The open-microphone portion of the recording lasts 5.5 minutes and begins at about 12:29 p.m. local time, a minute before the assassination. Verbal time stamps were made periodically by the police radio dispatcher and can be heard on the recording.

== House Select Committee on Assassinations ==
In December 1978, the House Select Committee on Assassinations (HSCA) had prepared a draft of its final report, concluding that Lee Harvey Oswald had acted alone in the assassination. However, after evidence from the Dictabelt recording was made available, the HSCA quickly reversed its conclusion and declared that a second gunman had fired the third of four shots heard. In a January 5, 1980, interview with journalist Earl Golz, HSCA chief counsel G. Robert Blakey later said: "If the acoustics come out that we made a mistake somewhere, I think that would end it [the multiple-shooter theory]." Despite serious criticism of the scientific evidence and the HSCA's conclusions, speculation regarding both the Dictabelt and the possibility of a second gunman persisted.

Investigators compared "impulse patterns" (suspected gunshots and associated echos) on the Dictabelt to 1978 test recordings of Carcano rifles fired in Dealey Plaza from the sixth floor of the Texas School Book Depository and from a stockade fence on the grassy knoll forward and to the right of the location of the presidential limousine. On this basis, the acoustics firm of Bolt, Beranek and Newman (BBN) concluded that impulse patterns 1, 2, and 4 were shots fired from the Depository, and that there was a 50% chance that impulse pattern 3 was a shot fired from the grassy knoll. Acoustics analysts Mark Weiss and Ernest Aschkenasy of Queens College reviewed the BBN data and concluded that "with the probability of 95% or better, there was indeed a shot fired from the grassy knoll."

Dr. James E. Barger of BBN testified to the HSCA that his statistical analysis of the impulse patterns captured on the Dallas police recordings showed that the motorcycle with the open microphone was about "120 to 138 feet" behind the presidential limousine at the time the first shot was fired. When the HSCA asked Weiss about the location of the motorcycle with the open microphone—"Would you consider that to be an essential ingredient in the ultimate conclusion of your analysis?"— Weiss answered, "It is an essential component of it, because, if you do not put the motorcycle in the place that it is —the initial point of where it was receiving the [sound of the gunfire]—, and if you do not move it at the velocity at which it is being moved on paper in this re-creation, you do not get a good, tight pattern that compares very well with the observed impulses on the police tape recording."

Using an amateur film shot of the motorcade, the HSCA concluded that the recording originated from the motorcycle of police officer H. B. McLain, who later testified before the committee that his microphone was often stuck in the open position. McLain did not hear the actual recording until after his testimony, and upon hearing it, he adamantly denied that the recording came from his motorcycle. He said that the other sounds on the recording did not match any of his movements.

Sirens are not heard on the recording until over two minutes after what is supposed to be the sound of the shooting, even though McLain accompanied the motorcade to Parkland Hospital immediately after the shooting with sirens blaring the whole time. When the sirens are heard on the Dictabelt recording, they rise and recede in pitch (i.e., the Doppler effect) and volume, as if they are passing by, rather than being recorded from a motorcycle accompanying the motorcade on the drive to the hospital. McLain also said that the engine sound was clearly from a three-wheeled motorcycle, not the two-wheeler that he drove. "There's no comparison to the two sounds," he said.

Other audio discrepancies also exist. Crowd noise is not heard on the Dictabelt recording, despite the sounds generated from the many onlookers along Dallas's Main Street and in Dealey Plaza (crowd noises can be heard on at least ten channel-2 transmissions from the motorcade). Someone is heard whistling a tune about a minute after the assassination. No one actually heard gunshots on the recording.

Some have argued that the only evidence that HSCA had for a second shooter was the Dictabelt sound recording. However the committee's Chief Counsel G. Robert Blakey wrote that this was a "myth" and the recording "played a major, though not determinative, role in favor of conspiracy". Four of the twelve HSCA members dissented to the HSCA's conclusion of conspiracy based on the acoustic findings, and a fifth thought a further study of the acoustic evidence was "necessary". Dissenting members of the committee included Congressmen Samuel L. Devine, Robert W. Edgar, and Harold S. Sawyer. Responding to a question asking how he would handle the Committee's report if he were at the Justice Department, Sawyer replied: "I'd file it in a circular file."

== Criticism ==
Richard E. Sprague, an expert on photographic evidence of the assassination and a consultant to the HSCA, noted that the amateur film the HSCA relied on showed that there was no motorcycle between those riding alongside the rear of the presidential limousine and H.B. McLain's motorcycle, and that other films showed McLain's motorcycle was actually 250 feet behind the presidential limousine when the first shot was fired, not 120 to 138 feet. There was also no motorcycle anywhere near the target area.

Adult magazine Gallery published a pull-out laminated cardboard recording, like those on the back of Cereal boxes, of the Dictabelt recording in its July 1979 issue. Assassination researcher Steve Barber repeatedly listened to that recording and heard the words "Hold everything secure until the homicide and other investigators can get there" at the point where the HSCA had concluded the assassination shots were recorded. However, those words were spoken by Sheriff Bill Decker about 90 seconds after the assassination, so the shots could not be when the HSCA claimed.

The FBI's Technical Services Division studied the acoustical data and issued a report on December 1, 1980 (dated November 19, 1980). The FBI report concluded that the HSCA failed to prove that there were gunshots on the recording and also failed to prove that the recording was made in Dealey Plaza. In fact, using the techniques of the previous investigators, the FBI matched a gunshot recorded in Greensboro, NC in 1979 with the sound that was supposedly a shot from the grassy knoll – purportedly suggesting that the initial investigation's methods were invalid.

== National Academy of Sciences ==
After the FBI disputed the validity of the acoustic evidence, the Justice Department paid for a review by the National Academy of Sciences, an organization operating with a Title 36 congressional charter.

On May 14, 1982, the panel of experts chaired by Harvard University's Norman Ramsey, released the results of their study. The NAS panel unanimously concluded that:

The acoustic analyses do not demonstrate that there was a grassy knoll shot, and in particular there is no acoustic basis for the claim of 95% probability of such a shot.
The acoustic impulses attributed to gunshots were recorded about one minute after the President had been shot and the motorcade had been instructed to go to the hospital.
Therefore, reliable acoustic data do not support a conclusion that there was a second gunman."

According to Ramsey, noises on the Dictabelt were "probably static". Louis Stokes, a member of the United States House of Representatives who chaired the HSCA, commented that the report "raised new and serious questions about our conclusions that need to be resolved."

Dr. Barger, the HSCA's acoustics expert, when asked about this discovery and the NAS analysis, replied,

Barber discovered a very weak spoken phrase on the DPD Dictabelt recording that is heard at about the time of the sound impulses we concluded were probably caused by the fourth shot. The NAS Committee has shown to our satisfaction that this phrase has the same origin as the same phrase heard also on the Audograph recording. The Audograph recording was originally made from the channel 2 radio. The common phrase is heard on channel 2 about a minute after the assassination would appear, from the context, to have taken place. Therefore, it would seem . . . that the sounds that we connected with gunfire were made about a minute after the assassination shots were fired. Upon reading the NAS report, we did a brief analysis of the Audograph dub that was made by the NAS Committee and loaned to us by them. We found some enigmatic features of this recording that occur at about the time that individuals react to the assassination. Therefore, we have doubt about the time synchronization of events on that recording, and so we doubt that the Barber hypothesis is proven. The NAS Committee did not examine the several items of evidence that corroborated our original findings, so that we still agree with the House Select Committee on Assassinations conclusion that our findings were corroborated

An analysis published in the March 2001 issue of Science & Justice by Dr. Donald B. Thomas used a different radio transmission synchronization to put forth the claim that the National Academy of Sciences panel was in error. Thomas' conclusion, very similar to the HSCA conclusion, was that the gunshot impulses were real to a 96.3% certainty. Thomas presented additional details and support in the November 2001 and September and November 2002 issues. Commenting on Thomas's study, G. Robert Blakey said: "This is an honest, careful scientific examination of everything we did, with all the appropriate statistical checks."

In 2005, Thomas' conclusions were rebutted in the same journal. Ralph Linsker and several members of the original NAS team, (Richard Garwin, Herman Chernoff, Paul Horowitz, and Ramsey) reanalyzed the timings of the recordings and reaffirmed in an article in Science & Justice the earlier conclusion of the NAS report that the alleged shot sounds were recorded approximately one minute after the assassination.

== Further analysis ==
The United States Department of Justice reviewed the HSCA report and the National Academy of Science's study of the sound evidence. It reported to the Judiciary Committee on March 28, 1988 and rebuked the HSCA's conclusion of a probable conspiracy.

In 2003, an independent researcher named Michael O'Dell reported that both the National Academy and Dr. Thomas had used incorrect timelines because they subtracted time for repeated sections when the playback needle got stuck but didn't realize there were also forward skips. When corrected, these showed the impulses happened too late to be the real shots even with Thomas's alternative synchronization. He pointed out that the claim of a 95% or higher probability of a shot from the grassy knoll was logically incorrect. It was a 5% chance of finding a match in random noise and didn’t consider other possible causes.

A November 2003 analysis paid for by the cable television channel Court TV concluded that the putative gunshot impulses did not match test gunshot recordings fired in Dealey Plaza any better than random noise. In December 2003, Thomas responded by pointing out what he claimed were errors in the November 2003 Court TV analysis. In 2005, five acoustic experts (Linsker, Garwin, Chernoff, Horowitz, and Ramsey) reinvestigated the acoustic recordings and noted several errors made by Thomas.

In 2013, Professor Larry J. Sabato, Ph.D. commissioned a study on the Dictabelt recording using more modern analytical techniques. The report concluded that the recording did not contain sounds of the assassination gunfire and that it would be of "doubtful utility" as evidence to prove or disprove a conspiracy.

In addition to this, about 90% of the witnesses present in Dealey Plaza during the shooting who were cited by the HSCA reported hearing 3 shots or less, while "only a total of four witnesses, out of 178 tabulated, reported shots coming from more than one direction."

== Digital restoration ==
In 2003, ABC News aired the results of its investigation on a program called Peter Jennings Reporting: The Kennedy Assassination: Beyond Conspiracy. Based on computer diagrams and recreations done by Dale K. Myers, it concluded that the sound recordings on the Dictabelt could not have come from Dealey Plaza, and that Dallas Police Officer H.B. McLain was correct in his assertions that he had not yet entered Dealey Plaza at the time of the assassination.

In the March 2005 issue of Reader's Digest, it was reported that Carl Haber and Vitaliy Fadeyev were assigned with the task of digitally restoring Dictabelt 10 by Leslie Waffen from the National Archives. Their method consisted of using sensors to map the microscopic contours of the tracks of old sound recordings without having to play them using a stylus, which would further degrade the sound. Dictabelt 10 was worn from countless playings and cracked due to improper storage.

== Possible origins ==
Left unanswered by the professional analyses was the question of whose open microphone captured the sounds recorded on the Dictabelt, if not Officer H.B. McLain. Jim Bowles, a Dallas police dispatcher supervisor in November 1963, and later Dallas County Sheriff, believes it originated from a particular officer on a three-wheeled motorcycle stationed at the Dallas Trade Mart, the original destination of President Kennedy's motorcade, along the same freeway to Parkland Hospital, which would account for the sound of sirens rushing by.

McLain believes that it was from a different officer on a three-wheeler near the Trade Mart, who was known for his whistling. When interviewed by author Vincent Bugliosi, the officer acknowledged that his microphone could have been stuck in the open position (he did not recall hearing any transmissions for several minutes), and could later have become unstuck after he followed the motorcade to Parkland Hospital.
