= Babushka Lady =

Person of interest in the 1963 assassination of President John F. Kennedy

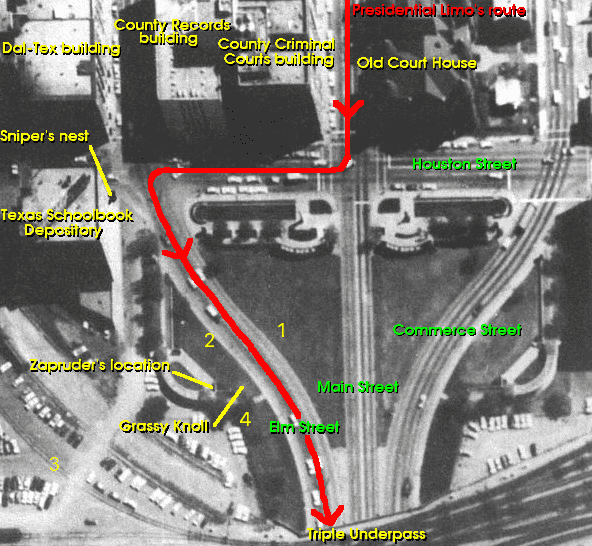
1. Babushka lady, 2. Umbrella man (Louie Witt), 3. Three tramps, 4. Badge man. Photo of Dealey Plaza (annotated), from Warren Commission report. North to the almost direct left.

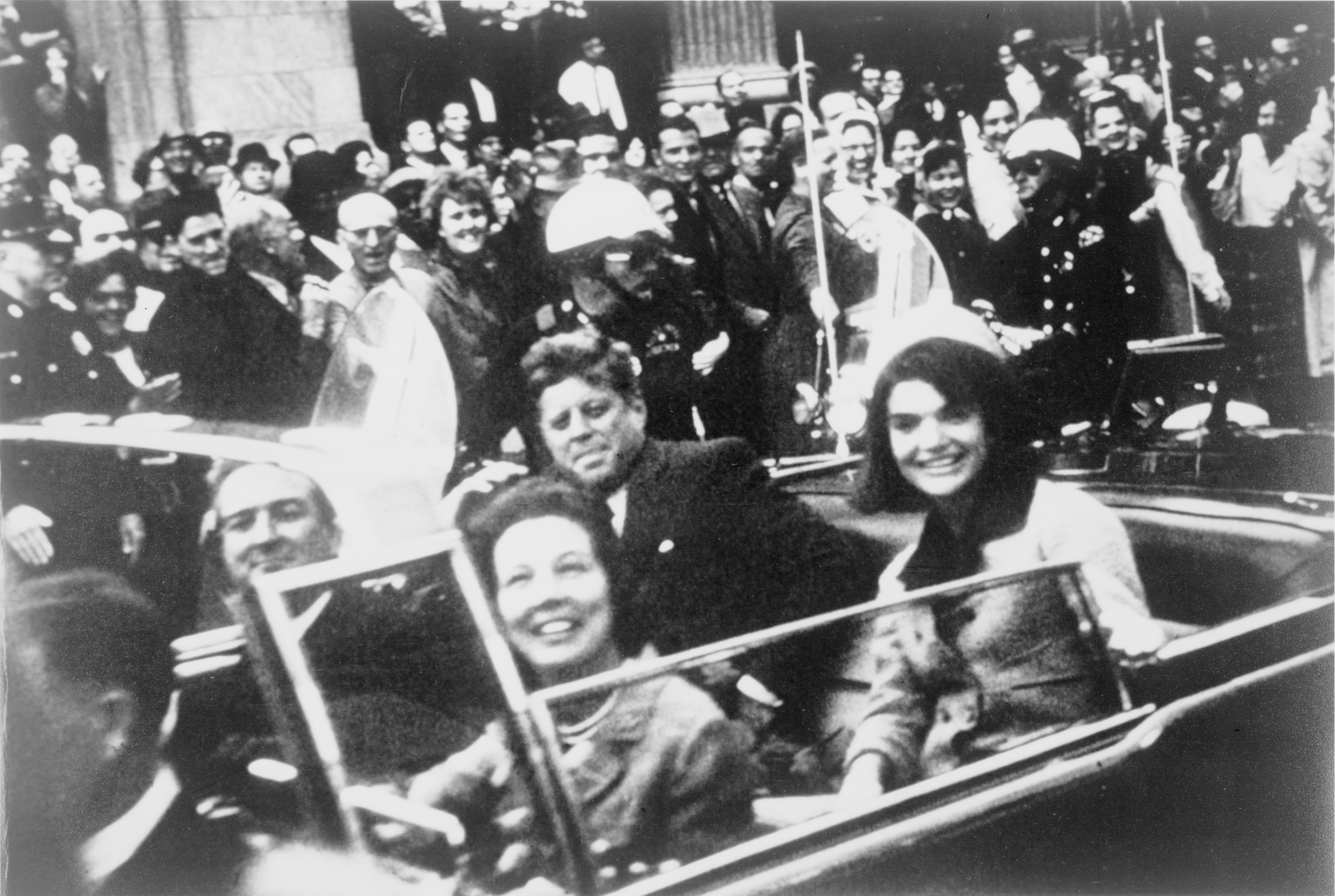
President John F. Kennedy, Jacqueline Kennedy, Nellie Connally, and Texas governor John Connally minutes before the assassination

The Babushka Lady is an unidentified woman present during the 1963 assassination of US President John F. Kennedy who is speculated to have photographed or filmed the events that occurred in Dallas' Dealey Plaza at the time President Kennedy was shot. Her nickname arose from the US Army headscarf she wore, which was similar to scarves worn by elderly Russian women. Babushka (Russian: бабушка) literally means "grandmother" or "old woman" in Russian.

The Babushka Lady was seen to be holding a camera by eyewitnesses and was also seen in film accounts of the assassination. Dressed in a tan or light-brown knee-length overcoat, a headscarf tied under her chin, and possibly sunglasses, she stood on the grass between Elm and Main streets, holding a camera to her face. Her calm demeanor stood in stark contrast to the panic of the surrounding crowd.

She is visible in the Zapruder film, as well as in the films of Orville Nix, Marie Muchmore, and Mark Bell, 44 minutes and 47 seconds into the Bell film; even though the shooting had already taken place and most of her surrounding witnesses took cover, she can be seen still standing with the camera at her face. After the shooting, she crossed Elm Street and joined the crowd that went up the grassy knoll.

The Babushka Lady is last seen in photographs walking east on Elm Street. Neither she, nor the film she may have taken, have ever been positively identified. Her first appearance on film chronologically is on the sidewalk in front of the Dallas County Building, which is visible in an image as being on Kennedy's right. She would have crossed Houston Street and onto Dealey Plaza in order to be visible in the Dealey Plaza images. This may imply that the images show two different women of similar appearance. It is plausible that once the motorcade passed by she was able to cross the street to catch a second motorcade drive past on Dealey Plaza where she would be on Kennedy's left.

== Beverly Oliver's claim ==
In 1970, a woman named Beverly Oliver (1946–2026) told conspiracy researcher Gary Shaw at a church revival meeting in Joshua, Texas, that she was the Babushka Lady. Oliver stated that she filmed the assassination with a Super 8 film Yashica and that she turned the undeveloped film over to two men who identified themselves to her as FBI agents. According to Oliver, she obtained no receipt from the men, who told her that they would return the film to her within ten days. She did not follow up with an inquiry.

Oliver reiterated her claims in the 1988 documentary The Men Who Killed Kennedy. According to Vincent Bugliosi, Oliver has "never proved to most people's satisfaction that she was in Dealey Plaza that day". Confronted with the fact that the Yashica Super-8 camera was not made until 1969, she stated that she received the "experimental" camera from a friend and was not sure the manufacturer's name was on it. A 1994 book she co-authored, Nightmare in Dallas, elaborated on her claims, but these have been widely challenged due to inconsistencies.

Critics have pointed out that Oliver's physical description—a 17-year-old slender blonde in 1963—contrasts sharply with the Babushka Lady's apparent age of 30 to 40, stockier build, and darker hair visible beneath the headscarf in Dealey Plaza films. Oliver's claims were the basis for a scene in Oliver Stone's 1991 film JFK, in which a character named "Beverly" meets Jim Garrison in a Dallas nightclub. Portrayed by Lolita Davidovich, she is depicted in the director's cut as wearing a headscarf at Dealey Plaza and speaking of having given the film she shot to two men claiming to be FBI agents.

== Alternative identification theories ==
In 2023, filmmaker Mary Haverstick proposed in her book A Woman I Know that the Babushka Lady could have been pioneering aviator Jerrie Cobb (1931–2019), a member of the Mercury 13 astronaut candidate group, or possibly CIA operative June Cobb (1928–2005), due to alleged identity overlaps and circumstantial ties to Dallas on November 22, 1963. Haverstick's theory draws on Jerrie Cobb's aviation activities, including her self-reported piloting of a small aircraft at Redbird Airport south of Dallas that day, and June Cobb's espionage background in anti-Castro plots. This identification remains speculative and has not been widely accepted by assassination researchers.

== Kodak lab claim ==
Assassination researcher Gary Mack testified before the Assassination Records Review Board (ARRB) in 1994 that he had been told by an executive in Kodak's Dallas office that a woman in her early 30s with brunette hair brought in film purported to be of the assassination scene while they were processing the Zapruder film. According to Mack, the executive said the woman explained to federal investigators already at the film processing office that she ran from Main Street across the grass to Elm Street where she stopped and snapped a photo. Mack said that he was told by the Kodak executive that the photo was extremely blurry and "virtually useless" and indicated that the woman likely went home without anyone recording her identity. This description does not match Beverly Oliver's self-reported appearance. A similar account was given by Kodak technician Jack Harrison, who claimed to have developed a color film for a brunette woman in her 30s or 40s on the day of the assassination.

== House Select Committee on Assassinations report ==
In March 1979, the Photographic Evidence Panel of the United States House Select Committee on Assassinations indicated that they were unable to locate any film attributed to the Babushka Lady. According to their report: "Initially, Robert Groden, a photographic consultant to the committee advised the panel as to pertinent photographic issues and related materials. Committee investigators located many of the suggested films and photographs, however, some items were never located, i.e. the Babushka Lady film, a color photograph by Norman Similas, and the original negative of the Betzner photograph."

== Public hearings of the Assassination Records Review Board ==
On November 18, 1994, assassination researcher Gary Mack testified before the ARRB regarding the Kodak lab claim detailed above. Also appearing that same day before the ARRB as "Beverly Oliver Massegee", Oliver stated that she was 17 years old at the time of the assassination. She told the Board that she was filming with an "experimental" 8 mm movie camera approximately 20 to 30 feet (6 to 9 m) from Kennedy when he was shot and that the film was confiscated by a man who identified himself as an FBI agent. According to Oliver, she handed over the camera because the man was an authority figure and because she feared being caught in possession of marijuana. Oliver's claims were addressed point by point and debunked by conspiracy theory researcher John McAdams.

== See also ==
- Badge Man
- Black dog man
- Three tramps
- Umbrella man (JFK assassination)
