= The Brass Armadillo =

Chain of antique malls in Iowa, US

The Brass Armadillo, Inc.
- Type: Private
- Industry: Retail
- Founded: 1992
- Headquarters: Ankeny, Iowa,
- Number of locations: 6 (2014)
- Key people: Larry Gottula, President; Dave Briddle, Vice President
- Products: antiques, collectibles, gifts, vintage items and knicknacks
- Website: brassarmadillo.com

The Brass Armadillo Antique Mall is a privately held chain of antique malls based in Ankeny, Iowa, USA. The company was founded by Larry Gottula and Dave Briddle in 1992. The chain has six malls in Denver, Des Moines, Kansas City, Omaha, Phoenix, and the Phoenix suburb of Goodyear, Arizona. Vendors rent and run individual stalls to showcase antiques and collectibles, offering to shoppers the convenience of many sellers under one roof. All the stores are open daily, 9 a.m. to 9 p.m., with the exception of Christmas Day, and are located on major interstate highways in order to be visible to travelers. The stores range in size from 30,000 to 50,000 square feet, with 375-750 dealers in each mall selling a variety of items including furniture, glassware, clothing, paintings, knick-knacks, jewelry and dolls. Automotive memorabilia is also featured including model cars, die casts and toys, as are wedding collectibles and vintage items. The Brass Armadillo is notable as one of the first chains of antique malls.

== History ==
Larry Gottula, Brass Armadillo president, and Dave Briddle, vice president, have known each other since Gottula hired Briddle in 1980 to work at one of the Food 4 Less grocery franchises he developed and owned in Iowa. In 1985, he sold the operation to Holiday Corporation of Minneapolis. In 1992, Gottula and Briddle founded the Brass Armadillo Antique Malls. They opened their first mall in a 20,000-square-foot building in Des Moines. The second Brass Armadillo was in a space that Gottula owned in Ankeny.

The Omaha store is the prototype for each Brass Armadillo location which followed, all of which are located along interstate highways for ease of visibility and vehicle access.

== Notable Events ==
In May 2011, The Brass Armadillo Antique Mall in Denver, Colorado hosted the first interview with Mary Moorman in nearly 48 years. Ms. Moorman appeared on the online show The Stover Hour to discuss her perspective on one of the most historic events in US History: The assassination of John F. Kennedy. Ms. Moorman captured the event in three Polaroid photographs, but had been conspicuously silent when it came to media interviews. She even declined to speak with The Warren Commission. Her interview on The Stover Hour was streamed live online at iAntique.com to discuss her photographs as well as the camera she used to capture them.
