= Dominick Bartone =

American gangster and convicted fraud

Dominick Bartone was an American gangster and arms dealer associated with the Cleveland mafia.

== Biography ==
=== 1950s ===
In 1956 Bartone got involved with the American William Alexander Morgan, who was fighting against the forces of the Cuban dictator Fulgencio Batista, Morgan purchased arms from Bartone. After the Cuban Revolution was successful Morgan turned against its leader Fidel Castro. In early April 1959 he flew to Miami to meet Bartone and Augusto Ferrando, consul general for the Dominican Republic. Over $500,000 worth of guns were sold by Bartone to Morgan, with Ferrando footing the bill. Morgan described Bartone as a "personal friend" of his. He hired the reporter Tony Beacon of the Philadelphia Daily News to manage the press relations of Morgan.

He was a friend of John Nardi, a Teamsters union official. Additionally, he was close with Nunzio Louis Triscaro, who ran the Teamsters local in Cleveland. In early 1959, through Troscaro, Bartone received the blessing of Teamsters president Jimmy Hoffa for a $300,000 Teamsters loan to purchase surplus military cargo planes for the new Cuban government led by Fidel Castro. According to one associate “The whole...thing was purely and simply Hoffa’s way of helping some of his mob buddies who were afraid of losing their business in Cuba. So they were trying to score points with Castro right after he moved in".

At the same time Bartone was attempting to sell to the Dominican Republic. Bartone loaded a C-74 with guns and ammunition, taking off at Miami. He had obtained a travel permit to land in Puerto Rico, but faked engine trouble and instead landed in the Dominican Republic to sell the arms. The US Customs Service were tipped off and he and his co-conspirators were arrested on 22 May, the plane and cargo were seized. On 4 June 1959 a grand jury in Miami indicted for conspiracy under section 371 of title 18, United States Code, to export arms and ammunition of war in section of section 1934, of title 22, United States Code, and for bribing officers of the United States in violation of section 201 of title 18 of United States Code. He pled guilty, receiving a $7500 fine and being put on probation.

While out on bail for the 1959 indictment, he was called to testify before the US Senate's McClellan Committee on organized crime within "the labor field". However he was excused because of concerns that his testimony could prejudice his arms smuggling case in Miami. He was to testify on his forced entry into the position of vice president of both the Alvin Naiman Corporation and Niagara Crush Stone. At this time he was still received a $250 per week plus expenses from both companies. With the backing of a Dominican businessman who contributed $200,000, Bartone took over Dinaloft Enterprises in Miami, which supplied flight meals to airlines like the Pan American World Airways. He continued his interest in airlines, being associated with Chauncey Marvin Holt.

=== 1960s and 1970s ===
In 1963 Justin F. Gleichauf, head of the CIA's Domestic Contact office in Miami, interviewed Bartone about potentially offering assistance to the CIA's sabotage campaign in Cuba. Bartone indicated his willingness to help, however Gleichauf concluded that Bartone possessed "little, if any potential" for use by the CIA because his legal status did not allow him to travel out of the United States, although he did conclude that "[Bartone] does have access to some rather unusual request from abroad for arms and he has promised to keep us advised as they develop".

In March 1977 he was convicted of conspiring to defraud the Northern Ohio Bank of Cleveland of $249,000. Two weeks after his conviction, Bartone and three others were indicted in Miami, Florida for conspiring to export 1000 machines guns in violation of the Neutrality Act. Bartone pled not guilty. The federal indictment charged that Bartone received a loan from the Trust Company after he filed a statement that he and his co-defendants owned an airplane, tracts of land and were constructing a trailer park; all of which was false. In reality the loan was used to purchase machine guns from an arms manufacturer from Georgia. The weapons were seized when undercover agents tipped off the authorities. In June 1978 he received five years in prison and a $10,000 fine for his Ohio bank fraud conviction back in 1977.
