= Chauncey Marvin Holt =

American self-proclaimed Mob associate and CIA operative (1921–1997)

- Born: October 23, 1921; Kentucky, United States
- Died: June 28, 1997 (aged 75)
- Known for: Claimed links to JFK's assassination

Chauncey Marvin Holt (October 23, 1921 – June 28, 1997) was an American known for claiming to be one of the "three tramps" photographed in Dealey Plaza shortly after the assassination of President John F. Kennedy.

== Background ==
Holt was born in Kentucky. In the late 1960s he was an associate of Dominick Bartone. He was also a friend of Detroit mobster Peter Licavoli.

He moved to San Diego County in the 1970s and lived in La Mesa, California during the last decade of his life. Holt died of cancer at the age of 75, and was survived by a daughter and granddaughter.

== Claims of involvement in JFK assassination ==
In a 1991 Newsweek article about Oliver Stone's JFK, Holt received national attention for various claims he made regarding the assassination of President Kennedy. According to Holt, he was a CIA operative sent to Dallas to deliver phony Secret Service credentials. He also claimed to have been the eldest of photographed "three tramps", although he was only 42 at the time. He also claimed to have worked as an accountant for Meyer Lansky. His account is further explored in his autobiography Self-Portrait of a Scoundrel, which was posthumously released by TrineDay Publishing in August 2013.
