= Union Terminal Company =

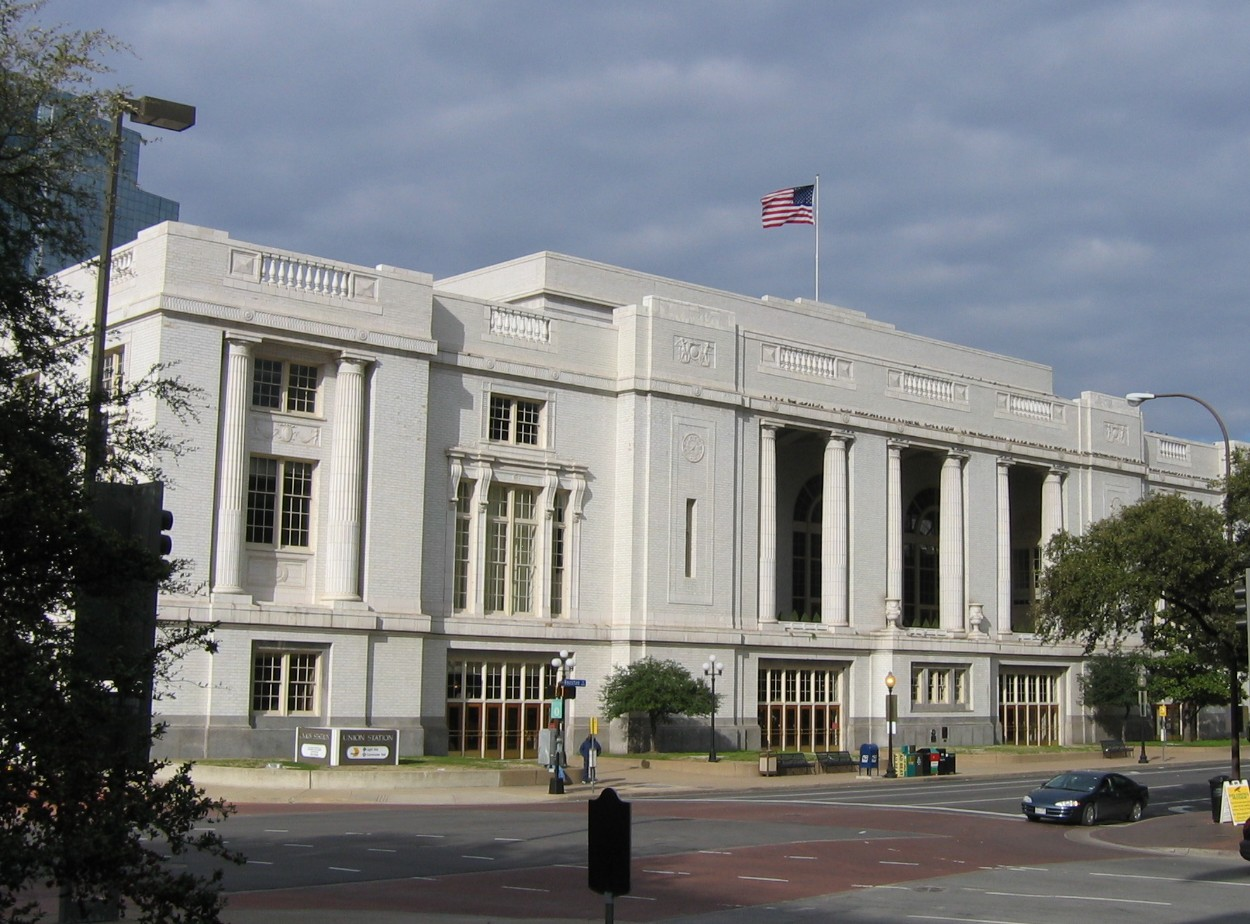
Dallas Union Station

The State of Texas chartered the Union Terminal Company on March 16, 1912. The mission of the company was to build a central terminal in Dallas for the seven railroads then serving the city. The terminal company ownership expanded to eight railroads, each having a 12.5% share: the Texas & Pacific; the Frisco; the Rock Island; the Cotton Belt; the Southern Pacific; the Santa Fe; the Katy; and the Trinity & Brazos Valley.

The company opened the Dallas Union Terminal in October 1916 and was also operating 5 miles of track within Dallas. At the peak of its usage, as many as eighty trains stopped each day at the station. The last passenger train departed the terminal on May 31, 1969, and the Union Terminal Company ceased doing business on March 13, 1974. Dallas Union Terminal is now called Union Station and is a DART rail, Trinity Railway Express commuter rail, and Amtrak inter-city rail station.

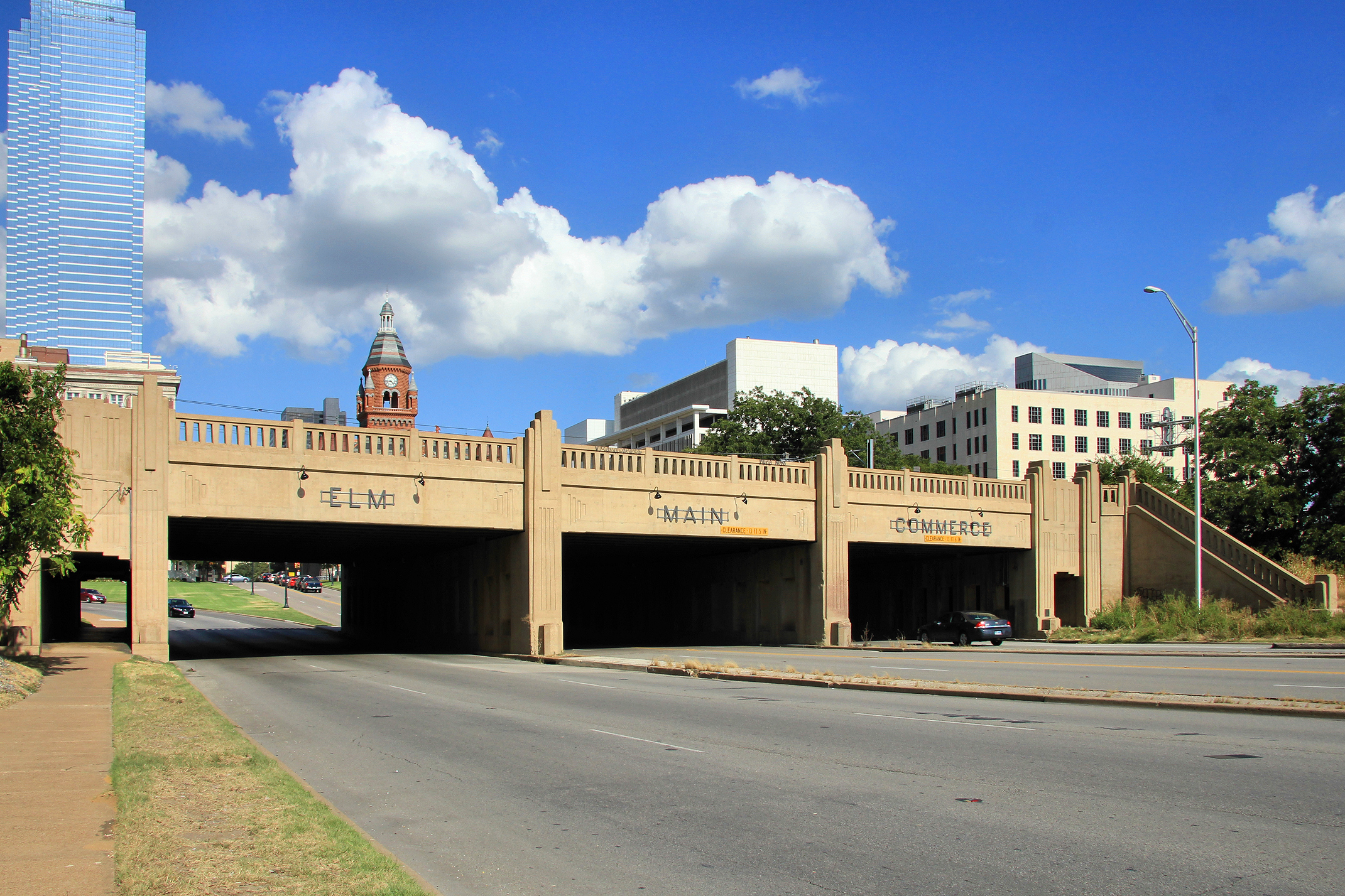
Triple underpass

In 1936, the Texas Highway Department with funding from the United States Bureau of Public Roads built a triple underpass to separate the grade of the Union Terminal Company track and Elm, Main and Commerce Streets. Railroad employees witnessed the assassination of John F. Kennedy in Dealey Plaza from the bridge on November 22, 1963. Lee Bowers, A Union Terminal Company employee working in a tower near the bridge, also witnessed the shooting and provided testimony to the Warren Commission.
