= Bernard Fensterwald =

American lawyer

- Born: August 2, 1921; Nashville, Tennessee, U.S.
- Died: April 2, 1991 (aged 69); Alexandria, Virginia, U.S.
- Education: Harvard Law School; Johns Hopkins University's Paul H. Nitze School of Advanced International Studies
- Occupation: Lawyer

Bernard "Bud" Fensterwald Jr. (August 2, 1921 – April 2, 1991) was an American lawyer who defended James Earl Ray and James W. McCord Jr. Other notable clients included Mitch WerBell, Richard Case Nagell and the widow of John Paisley.

== Early life ==
Fensterwald was born on August 2, 1921, in Nashville, Tennessee. He served in the United States Navy during World War II. Fensterwald graduated from Harvard College in 1942 and Harvard Law School in 1949. He entered the Paul H. Nitze School of Advanced International Studies at Johns Hopkins University and received an M.A. in 1950.

== Career ==
=== Department of State ===
From 1951 to 1956 Fensterwald worked for the State Department as an Assistant Legal Advisor. This included defending State Department employees accused by Joseph McCarthy of being members of the American Communist Party. In 1957 Fensterwald was hired by Thomas C. Hennings as an investigator for the Senate Committee on Constitutional Rights. In the 1960s he was chief counsel for the Senate Judiciary Committee under Senator Edward V. Long." Fensterwald once implied that Long was being blackmailed by the FBI.

=== Committee to Investigate Assassinations ===
In 1968-1969, Fensterwald and Richard E. Sprague founded a private sector "Committee to Investigate Assassinations," which primarily concerned itself with the Kennedy assassination. In 1973, in honor of the 10th anniversary of JFK's death, Fensterwald held what was, according to Peter Dale Scott, the first commemorative conference on assassination of a kind that would become common on the tail end of the 20th century; better known are the organizations and events and followed in the wake of Fensterwald’s successful effort, such as the Coalition on Political Assassination (COPA), the Assassination Records Review Board (ARRB), and the Assassination Symposium on Kennedy (ASK) conferences.

In the late 1970s, he was Congressman Thomas N. Downing's favorite to become chief counsel for the House Select Committee on Assassinations but withdrew himself from consideration after objection from Congressman Henry B. Gonzalez. In 1984, Fensterwald and James Lesar (with whom Fensterwald had represented James Earl Ray) founded the Assassination and Archives Research Center (AARC).

=== Counsel to Watergate 'Plumber' James McCord ===
One of Fensterwald's more notable cases was his unsuccessful defense of Watergate criminal James McCord. He was also connected to other characters on the fringes of Watergate. John Paisley, who was the CIA liaison to the White House Plumbers, was Fensterwald's friend and neighbor. When Paisley died under suspicious circumstances, his widow hired Fensterwald to investigate. Prior to the Watergate burglaries, both Fensterwald and McCord employed a private investigator named Lou Russell.

== Personal life and death ==
Fensterwald had a wife, Patricia, and a son, Bernard. He died of a heart attack in Alexandria, Virginia, aged 69.

== Bibliography ==
=== Books ===
- Assassination of JFK (1977). Zebra.
- Coincidence or Conspiracy? (1977), with Michael Ewing. Kensington. ISBN 978-0890832325.

=== Articles ===
- "Sovereign Immunity and Soviet State Trading." Harvard Law Review, vol. 63, no. 4 (Feb. 1950), pp. 614–642. doi:10.2307/1335992. JSTOR 1335992.
- "The Anatomy of American 'Isolationism' and Expansionism, Part II." Journal of Conflict Resolution, vol. 2, no. 2 (Jun. 1958), pp. 111–139. JSTOR 172971.
- "The Anatomy of American 'Isolationism' and Expansionism, Part I." Journal of Conflict Resolution, vol. 2, no. 4 (Dec. 1958), pp. 280–309. JSTOR 172887.
- "Eight Little Words." SAIS Review, vol. 4, no. 1 (Aug. 1959), pp. 14–19. JSTOR 45348812.
- "Constitutional Law: The States and the Amending Process—A Reply." American Bar Association Journal, vol. 46, no. 7 (1960), pp. 717–721. JSTOR 25721216.

=== Conference proceedings ===
- "Regime of the High Seas," with Montgomery Phister, Thomas Franck, and Richard Young. Proceedings of the American Society of International Law at Its Annual Meeting, vol. 50, Special Issue: Evolution of International Law in the 20th Century (Apr. 25-28, 1956), pp. 136–154. JSTOR 25657346.

=== Memos ===
- "Memorandum by Bernard Fensterwald, Office of the Assistant Legal Adviser for United Nations Affairs, to Dwight M. Cramer of the Office of Dependent Area Affairs" (Jun. 10, 1954). In: Foreign Relations of the United States, 1952–1954, United Nations Affairs, vol. III (Document 943).
