= Gordon Arnold =

Alleged witness of JFK's assassination

- Born: Gordon Leslie Arnold; August 14, 1941; Toronto, Ontario, Canada
- Died: October 15, 1997 (aged 56); Lancaster, Texas, U.S.
- Occupation: U.S. Army soldier
- Known for: Alleged witness of JFK's assassination

Gordon Leslie Arnold (August 14, 1941 – October 15, 1997) was a Canadian-American man who claimed to have witnessed the assassination of United States President John F. Kennedy in Dallas, Texas.

Arnold did not become known as an eyewitness to the assassination until 1978, when on August 27 of that year, The Dallas Morning News published an article by Earl Golz alleging that several "counterfeit" agents of the United States Secret Service were in Dealey Plaza shortly before and after the assassination. The following day, the story was reported by the Associated Press and United Press International. Arnold would later be interviewed on his alleged experience for The Men Who Killed Kennedy. Witness to the assassination Senator Ralph Yarborough told Golz that "Immediately on the firing of the first shot I saw the man you interviewed throw himself on the ground....He was down within a second of the time the shot was fired and I thought to myself, ‘There’s a combat veteran who knows how to act when weapons start firing.'"

According to the report, Arnold and at least four other individuals said they met men who identified themselves as Secret Service agents. Arnold stated that he was attempting to move to the railroad bridge above the triple underpass to film the presidential limousine and motorcade when a man with a badge who said he was with the Secret Service told him that he could not be there. According to Arnold in that interview, he moved to a dirt mound in front of the picket fence on the "grassy knoll" where he filmed the motorcade as it moved down Elm Street. He described at least one shot as being fired past his left ear from behind, stating that he "hit the dirt" after feeling the first just over his left shoulder, and that while lying down his impression was that at least one more shot came from that location, although he said he heard the echoes of gunfire through the Plaza which made it difficult to determine the source of the other shot(s) with certainty. Arnold indicated that he remained lying down for the duration of the shooting until he was confronted by two policemen who confiscated his film and ordered him to leave the area. Arnold would give more information in The Men Who Killed Kennedy interview, where he mentioned that the film was confiscated by a man wearing a policeman's uniform, except he was not wearing a hat. Arnold suggested that he had been afraid to report the incident due to claims of "peculiar" deaths of witnesses to the assassination.

According to the report, at the time of the assassination Arnold was a soldier who had just completed basic training and was reporting for duty in Fort Wainwright, Alaska two days later. In 1978, he was an investigator with the Dallas Department of Consumer Affairs. Arnold rose to the rank of Specialist 5 in the United States Army.
