= Richard E. Sprague =

American author and conspiracy theorist (1921–1996)

- Born: August 27, 1921; Philadelphia, United States
- Died: January 27, 1996 (aged 74)
- Occupations: Author, researcher

Richard E. Sprague (August 27, 1921 – January 27, 1996) was an American computer technician, researcher and author. According to American journalist Richard Russell, investigatior of the John Kennedy assassination, Sprague was "the leading gatherer of photographic evidence about the Kennedy assassination". Sprague published his investigation in 1976–1985 as three editions of The Taking of America, 1-2-3.

== Career ==
Richard E. Sprague is not to be confused with United States House Select Committee on Assassinations original Chief Counsel Richard A. Sprague (1925–2021), who resigned along with his deputy, Robert K. Tanenbaum due to direct interference by CIA operatives early in their investigation. Richard A. Sprague in 1969 served as special prosecutor in the murder of Joseph Yablonski and his family. It was Richard A. Sprague, not Richard E. Sprague, who served as the First Assistant District Attorney in Philadelphia.

Born in Philadelphia on August 27, 1921, Richard E. Sprague graduated from Purdue University in 1942. During World War II, he served with the U.S. Navy, finishing with the rank of Lieutenant (Junior Grade). After the war, he was employed as an engineer at Northrup Aircraft. By 1950, he had left Northrup to help co-found the Computer Research Corporation located in Hawthorne, California. By 1960, he had moved on to become the Director of Computer Systems Consulting for Touche, Ross, Bailey And Smart which would later be simply known as Touche Ross until 1989.

Appeared as a contestant on the Groucho Marx radio quiz program You Bet Your Life on May 21, 1952.

After the assassination of John F. Kennedy took place on November 22, 1963, Sprague began investigating the deed on his own in 1966 upon seeing the Abraham Zapruder produced Zapruder film.

Sprague served a year as photographic expert in the 1966-1969 investigations conducted by New Orleans District Attorney Jim Garrison. He is thanked in Garrison's 1988 book On the Trail of the Assassins for his "constant and crucial advice and support".

In 1968 he co-founded the Committee to Investigate Assassinations with Bernard Fensterwald. That same year, he also set up Sprague Research and Consulting.

Sprague later worked as a full-time consultant to Battelle Memorial Institute of Frankfurt, Germany.

Richard E. Sprague died on January 27, 1996, with his last known address in Virginia. He was interred at Washington Park East Cemetery in Indianapolis, Indiana.

== Research on the John F. Kennedy assassination ==
In the May 1970 issue of Computers And Automation, Sprague said that he used computer analysis of still photographs and movie film from Dealey Plaza to determine that at least four gunmen and fifty conspirators were involved in Kennedy's assassination. Sprague stated that the evidence indicated six shots were fired at John F. Kennedy. According to Sprague, President Kennedy was hit by four shots, Connally was hit by another, and one missed. Five years later in September 1975, Sprague and L. Fletcher Prouty stated that their study of still photographs and film of the assassination revealed that no shots were fired from the Texas School Book Depository's sixth floor window and that Lee Harvey Oswald was framed by planted and altered evidence.

Much of Sprague's information and conclusions had already been published in the magazines Computers and Automation and People and The Pursuit of Truth before Sprague wrote The Taking of America, 1-2-3.

According to Sprague's research, because of the location of the great oak tree with dense crown that crossed the trajectory of the shot from the 6th Floor of the building onto Elm Street, it is unlikely that Lee Harvey Oswald could fire from the window near where the rifle was subsequently found.

Sprague's analysis of Abraham Zapruder's film was used in "The Guns of Dallas" article written by L. Fletcher Prouty.
