= Dale K. Myers =

American computer animator

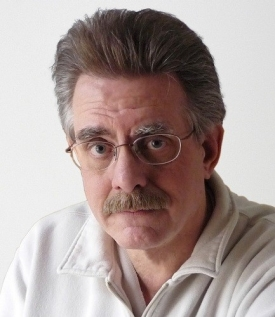
- Born: 1955 (age 70–71)
- Years active: 1973–present
- Known for: Research on John Kennedy's Assassination
- Notable work: Secrets of a Homicide: JFK Assassination

Dale K. Myers (born 1955) is an American animator, voice actor, author, director, screenwriter, producer and John F. Kennedy assassination researcher. He was honored in 2004 with an Emmy Award from the National Academy of Television Arts and Sciences for his computer-animated recreation of the Kennedy assassination featured in ABC News' 40th anniversary television special, Peter Jennings Reporting: The Kennedy Assassination — Beyond Conspiracy (2003). He is also noted for authoring, With Malice: Lee Harvey Oswald and the Murder of Officer J. D. Tippit (1998) and Computer Animation: Expert Advice on Breaking Into the Business. (1999).

== Opinions ==
In an interview with John Kelin in 1982, when asked what he thought about Oswald, Myers responded with the following remark; "...First off, I don't think Lee Harvey Oswald pulled the trigger." Myers also said that as far as saying Oswald is guilty, "...I find that extremely hard to believe". However, most revealing of all was his denial that Oswald had shot Tippit; namely that "I think I will be able to show, beyond a reasonable doubt, that Oswald was not the killer of officer J.D. Tippit."

As a result of his research, which includes his viewing of the Zapruder film, Myers has formed the opinion that Oswald acted alone in killing Kennedy. He supports the official conclusion that Oswald acted alone. He concludes the first shot was fired at approximately Frame 160 of the film, and this shot completely missed the motorcade. Texas Governor John Connally, who was looking to his left in Frame 160, is looking to his right by Frame 167, a lapse of less than a half second, which Myers equates with a sudden head jerk in response to the shot behind his right shoulder.

- The second shot hit both President Kennedy and Governor Connally some time between Frames 223 and 224 (about 3.5 seconds after the first shot).
- Frame 223 shows Connally emerging from behind a sign with the view of the President still obstructed by the sign.
- Frame 224 shows Kennedy partially emerging from the sign with his hands clenched in front of his throat.
- The right lapel of Connally's coat has "popped" in an outward direction by Frame 224, which Myers reports is the result of the second bullet entering Connally after passing through Kennedy.
- Finally, Myers reports that the third and final shot was the fatal shot to the President's head in Frame 313 (almost 5 seconds after the second shot).

During a 2003 ABC television broadcast, Myers opined that the single bullet theory was "a single bullet fact."
