= The Men Who Killed Kennedy =

- DVD cover
- Genre: Documentary
- Created by: Nigel Turner
- Narrated by: Hilary Minster
- Countries of origin: United Kingdom; United States
- Original language: English
- No. of episodes: 9

Production
- Running time: 100 mins (1988 version of two episodes); 150 mins (1991 version of three episodes); 300 mins (2002 version of six episodes)
- Production company: Nigel Turner Productions / History Channel

Original release
- Network: Central Independent Television (UK) / A&E (U.S. 1991) / History Channel (U.S. 1995–2003)
- Release: October 25, 1988 – November 17, 2003

The Men Who Killed Kennedy is a video documentary series by British television network ITV that depicts the assassination of U.S. President John F. Kennedy on November 22, 1963. Originally broadcast in 1988 in two parts (with a subsequent studio discussion), it was rebroadcast in 1991 re-edited to three parts with additional material, and a fourth episode added in 1995. The addition of three further episodes in 2003 caused great controversy, particularly in the final episode implicating Lyndon B. Johnson and the withdrawal of these additional episodes.

== Broadcast history and critical response ==
=== 1988 to 2003 ===
The Men Who Killed Kennedy began with two 50-minute segments originally aired on 25 October 1988 in the United Kingdom, entitled simply Part One and Part Two. The programmes were produced by Central Television for the ITV network, and was followed three weeks later with a studio discussion on the issues titled The Story Continues, chaired by broadcaster Peter Sissons.

The original broadcast was controversial in Britain. The episodes identify three men as the assassins of Kennedy: deceased drug trafficker Lucien Sarti and two living men (Roger Bocagnani and Sauveur Pironti). All three were later revealed to have strong alibis: Sarti was undergoing medical treatment in France, another was in prison at the time, and the third had been in the French Navy. One of the two living men threatened to sue, and Central Television's own subsequent investigation into the allegations revealed they were "total nonsense". Turner justified his failure to interview one of the accused on the grounds that the individual was "too dangerous". Turner was censured by the British Parliament. The Independent Broadcasting Authority forced Central Television to produce a third episode dedicated to the false allegations, which aired on November 16, 1988, which was later referred to as a "studio crucifixion" of Turner and his inaccuracies.

The United States corporation, Arts & Entertainment Company, purchased the rights to the original two segments. In 1989, the series was nominated for a Flaherty Documentary Award. In November 1991, the series was re-edited with additional material and divided into three 50-minute programmes, which were also shown by ITV on consecutive nights. An additional episode appeared in 1995. The series typically aired in November every year and from time to time during the year.

David Browne of Entertainment Weekly described the documentary as "well-researched, but still farfetched".

=== 2003 onwards ===
In November 2003, three additional segments ("The Final Chapter") were added by the History Channel, entitled, respectively, "The Smoking Guns", "The Love Affair" and "The Guilty Men".

"The Smoking Guns" examines claims of changes to the procedures normally followed by the Secret Service on the day of the assassination, bullet damage to the windshield of the president's limousine consistent with a bullet fired through it from the front, and discrepancies between observations made by the doctors who treated Kennedy at Parkland Hospital after the shooting and the official autopsy and photographs of the president's body which were cited by the Warren Commission.

"The Love Affair" focuses on the claims that Judyth Vary Baker was Lee Harvey Oswald's lover in 1963, and that she worked with Oswald and others to develop a cancer-causing biological weapon as part of a CIA plan to assassinate Fidel Castro.

The third of these additional segments – "The Guilty Men" – was based substantially on the book Blood, Money & Power: How L.B.J. Killed J.F.K. by Barr McClellan. The book and the episode directly implicate Lyndon B. Johnson (LBJ) – who was the U.S. Vice President at the time of the assassination – and its airing in 2003 created an outcry among Johnson's surviving associates, including Johnson's widow, Lady Bird Johnson, former LBJ aides Bill Moyers and Jack Valenti (longtime president of the Motion Picture Association of America), as well as former U.S. Presidents Gerald Ford – who was the last living Warren Commission member – and Jimmy Carter. These Johnson supporters lodged complaints of libel with the History Channel, and subsequently threatened legal action against Arts & Entertainment Company, owner of the History Channel. The History Channel responded by assembling a panel of three historians, Robert Dallek, Stanley Kutler, and Thomas Sugrue. On a program aired April 7, 2004, titled "The Guilty Man: A Historical Review", the panel agreed that the documentary was not credible and should not have aired. The History Channel issued a statement saying, in part, "The History Channel recognizes that 'The Guilty Men' failed to offer viewers context and perspective, and fell short of the high standards that the network sets for itself. The History Channel apologized to its viewers and to Mrs. Johnson and her family for airing the show." The channel said it would not show the episode again. Author Barr McClellan, on whose work the episode was largely based, complained that he had tried to cooperate with the reviewing historians to discuss his evidence with them and had been ignored.

Malcolm Liggett, a retired economics professor, labor economist at the Equal Employment Opportunity Commission, and employee of the Office for Wage and Price Stability in the Executive Office of the President from 1975 to 1981 sued A&E regarding the episode "The Smoking Guns", which claims Liggett was involved in a conspiracy to kill Kennedy. Liggett and A&E reached a settlement which required that a letter by Liggett be read on the show History Center.

Addressing "The Guilty Men" episode, Dorothy Rabinowitz of The Wall Street Journal called it a "primitive piece of conspiracy-mongering" and wrote that "the documentary's ever deepening mess of charges and motives is never less than clear about its main point—that Lyndon Johnson personally arranged the murder not only of the president, but also seven other people, including his own sister."

In a letter to the chief executives of the three parent companies of A&E Networks – Victor F. Ganzi of the Hearst Corporation, Michael D. Eisner of Disney, and Robert C. Wright of NBC – former United States President Gerald Ford described the allegations as "the most damaging accusations ever made against a former vice president and president in American history."

== Episode list ==
The first two episodes were followed by "The Story Continues" (16 November 1988), a critical studio discussion about them. The final episode was followed by a critical review, "The Guilty Men: A Historical Review." (7 April 2004).

1. "The Coup D'Etat" (25 October 1988 [UK]) (27 September 1991 [U.S.])
2. "The Forces Of Darkness" (25 October 1988 [UK]) (4 October 1991 [U.S.])
3. "The Cover-Up" Timeline (11 October 1991 [U.S.])
4. "The Patsy" (18 October 1991 [U.S.])
5. "The Witnesses" (25 October 1991 [U.S.])
6. "The Truth Shall Set You Free" (18 November 1995 [U.S.])
7. "The Smoking Guns" (17 November 2003 [U.S.])
8. "The Love Affair" (17 November 2003 [U.S.])
9. "The Guilty Men" (17 November 2003 [U.S.])

== See also ==
- Assassination of John F. Kennedy in popular culture
