= George G. Burkley =

American physician (1902/1903–1991)

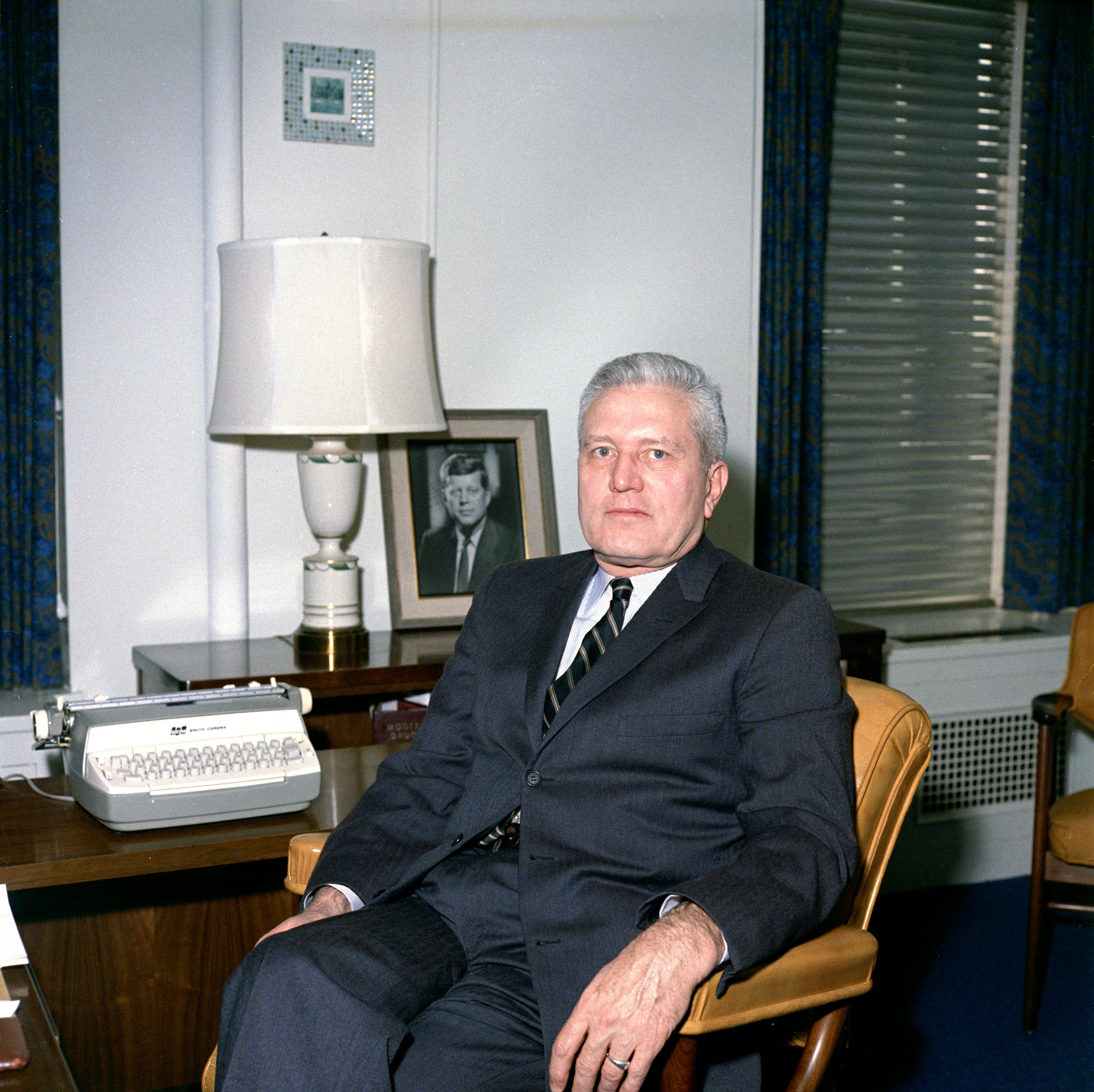
George Burkley

George Gregory Burkley (August 29, 1902 – January 2, 1991) was a vice admiral in the United States Navy and physician who served three presidents of the United States.

== Early life ==
Burkley was born in Pittsburgh, Pennsylvania, graduated from the University of Pittsburgh, and the University of Pittsburgh School of Medicine. He studied at the Mayo Clinic in Rochester, Minnesota from 1929 to 1932 before returning to Pittsburgh where he practiced medicine and taught at the University of Pittsburgh School of Medicine; his specialties were cardiology and internal medicine.

Burkley joined the United States Navy as a lieutenant commander in 1941, and served in the South Pacific during World War II. Afterward, he was assigned to various Navy hospitals and in 1957 was commander of the Naval Dispensary in Washington, D.C.

== Physician to the President ==
Burkley headed the Navy-operated Presidential retreat at Camp David during the tenure of President Dwight D. Eisenhower, and served Eisenhower on a 1959 11-nation tour of Asia. During the Kennedy administration, he was named assistant White House physician to Janet G. Travell in 1961 then eventually succeed Travell to become Physician to the President in July 1963.

When Kennedy was assassinated in Dallas, Texas on November 22, 1963, Burkley was present in the motorcade. After the assassination, he accompanied Kennedy's body back to Washington and was present during the autopsy for which he was instrumental in choosing its location at Bethesda Naval Hospital. He signed the President's death certificate. When asked by the JFK Library in 1967 whether he agreed with the Warren Commission regarding the number of bullets which struck President Kennedy he replied, that "I would not care to be quoted on that". Burkley, through his attorney, informed the House Select Committee on Assassinations that he believed that there was a conspiracy involved in the killing of the President. In the 1990s the Assassination Records Review Board (ARRB), with Burkley and his lawyer now deceased, sought out the records related to Burkley held by his lawyer's firm. However his daughter declined to sign a waiver that would have allowed the ARRB access.

After Lyndon B. Johnson became president, Burkley was appointed his personal physician, and in 1965 he was promoted to vice admiral. He retired at the end of the Johnson administration in January 1969.

== Later life and death ==
After retirement, Burkley lived in Chevy Chase, Maryland. He moved to Blairsville, Pennsylvania in 1970, then to Los Angeles in 1975 two years after the death of his wife, the former Isabel Winburn.

On January 2, 1991, Burkley died of pneumonia at a nursing home in Los Angeles.
