= Earl Rose (coroner) =

American physician

- Rose in 1967
- Born: Earl Forrest Rose; September 23, 1926; Eagle Butte, South Dakota, US
- Died: May 1, 2012 (aged 85); Iowa City, Iowa, US
- Occupations: Forensic pathologist, professor of medicine
- Known for: Medical examiner in Dallas, Texas, at the time of the assassination of President John F. Kennedy
- Spouse: Marilyn Preheim (1951–2012; his death)
- Children: 6

Earl Forrest Rose (September 23, 1926 – May 1, 2012) was an American forensic pathologist, professor of medicine, and lecturer of law. Rose was the medical examiner for Dallas County, Texas, at the time of the assassination of United States President John F. Kennedy and he performed autopsies on J. D. Tippit, Lee Harvey Oswald, and Jack Ruby. After being shoved by Kennedy's aides, he stepped aside and allowed Kennedy's body to be removed from Parkland Memorial Hospital without performing an autopsy.

== Early life ==
Rose was born in Eagle Butte, South Dakota, on September 23, 1926, to Forest—a cowboy and rodeo rider— and Lena Berghuis Rose. He grew up on a remote ranch 26 miles from Eagle Butte on the Cheyenne River Indian Reservation. Rose was reported to have ridden his horse five miles to get to school. According to his memoirs, he attended "one room country grade schools" before going to high school in Eagle Butte.

In the spring of 1944, at the end of his junior year, the 17-year-old Rose dropped out of high school and enlisted in the United States Navy where he served on a submarine, the USS Sea Devil, in the Pacific theater of World War II. According to Rose, at the end of hostilities his boat moored in Shanghai and Qingdao, China, and served as a "military presence" patrolling the China Seas.

He was discharged from the Navy in 1946, then attended Yankton College from which he graduated with a B.A. 1949. While at Yankton, he met Marilyn Preheim, who was a medical tech student at a nearby hospital. The couple married in the Mennonite Church on July 28, 1951, and eventually had a son and five daughters.

Rose studied medicine for two years at the University of South Dakota, then earned his M.D. from the University of Nebraska in 1953. In the mid-1950s, he interned in Denver, Colorado, worked in private practice in Lemmon, South Dakota, then completed specialty training with residencies at Baylor University Medical Center in Dallas (surgical pathology) and DePaul Hospital in St. Louis (clinical pathology). Rose then sub-specialized with a fellowship in forensic pathology at the Medical College of Virginia. He worked as a forensic pathologist in Virginia where he held the title of Deputy Chief Examiner for the Tidewater Region of Virginia.

In June 1963, Rose moved to Dallas where he became medical examiner for the city and county of Dallas. According to The New York Times, he was "hired by the county to establish a scientifically valid medical examiner’s system to replace its existing system of elected lay coroners." While working as a medical examiner in Dallas, Rose received a law degree from Southern Methodist University.

== Kennedy assassination ==
=== John F. Kennedy ===
On November 22, 1963, Rose was in his office at Parkland Memorial Hospital across the corridor from Trauma Room 1 when he received word that Kennedy was pronounced dead. He walked across the corridor to the trauma room occupied by Jacqueline Kennedy and a priest who had been called in to administer last rites. There, Rose was met by Secret Service agent Roy Kellerman and Kennedy's personal physician George Burkley who told him that there was no time for an autopsy because Mrs. Kennedy would not leave Dallas without her husband's body which was to be delivered promptly to the airport.

At the time of the assassination, the murder of a United States President was not a federal crime. Rose objected, insisting that Texas law required him to perform a post-mortem examination prior to the removal of the body. A heated exchange ensued as he argued with Kennedy's aides. Kennedy's body was placed in a casket and, accompanied by Mrs. Kennedy, rolled down the corridor on a gurney. Rose was reported to have stood in a hospital doorway, backed by a policeman, in an attempt to prevent the removal of the coffin.

According to Robert Caro's The Years of Lyndon Johnson: The Passage of Power, the President's aides "had literally shoved [Rose] and the policeman aside to get out of the building." In an interview with Journal of the American Medical Association, Rose stated that he stepped aside feeling that it was unwise to exacerbate the tension.

Rose received criticism for arguing with federal officials at Parkland. For his role in the immediate aftermath of the assassination, he was disparaged by William Manchester in his 1967 book The Death of a President. Describing Manchester's portrayal of Rose, Peter Knight wrote: "If Dallas and Oswald are the overt culprits of the crime, then Earl Rose is the cameo villain of the book." According to a 2003 AP report, Rose's son, Forrest, believed that the book "depicted [Rose] as an unreasonable, petty state bureaucrat with a gripe." BMJ wrote that he was "portrayed almost comically as a small time official trying to act important; a portrayal most now see as unjustified."

In a 1992 interview published in the Journal of the American Medical Association, Rose said, "The law was broken" and that "[a] Texas autopsy would have assured a tight chain of custody on all the evidence." In 2003, Rose said he still believed that he and his staff should have been allowed to perform the post-mortem examination of Kennedy and that many conspiracy theories about the assassination would have been quelled had he examined the President.

=== J. D. Tippit ===
Rose began his autopsy of Dallas Police Officer J.D. Tippit at 3:14 pm on November 22. He found bullet entrance wounds on the officer's body: two on the right side of his chest, one in his right temple, and a superficial wound to his left rib. Rose removed the three bullets that had entered Tippit's chest and head, noting that there was massive hemorrhaging as a result of penetration of the lung and liver, as well as a large amount of damage to his brain.

=== Lee Harvey Oswald ===
Two days after the assassination of Kennedy, Rose was called out of church to tend to Oswald, who had been fatally shot by Jack Ruby. Announcing the results of the gross autopsy, Rose said: "The two things that we could determine were, first, that he died from a hemorrhage from a gunshot wound, and that otherwise he was a physically healthy male." His examination found that Ruby's bullet entered Oswald's left side in the front part of the abdomen and caused damage to his spleen, stomach, aorta, vena cava, kidney, liver, diaphragm, and eleventh rib before coming to rest on his right side.

In 1979, Michael Eddowes—who wrote a book claiming that the man who assassinated Kennedy was a look-alike of Oswald put in place by Soviet secret police—filed suit in Fort Worth, Texas, in order to exhume Oswald's body for verification of its identity. There was reported to have been some controversy regarding Rose's measurement of Oswald's height and that he did not note a mastoidectomy scar which was claimed to exist by others. Rose said he did not object to the exhumation. He was reported to have met Eddowes and to have had "great respect" for him.

=== Jack Ruby ===
On January 3, 1967, Ruby, the murderer of Oswald, died at Parkland Hospital. Rose began the autopsy on Ruby an hour after his death, and a report released the following month indicated that three doctors from the University of Texas Southwestern Medical School assisted him in the post-mortem examination. The cause of death was determined to be a lung obstruction due to a massive blood clot. Rose was quoted as saying that the clot originated in one of Ruby's legs and traveled through his heart to the lungs.

After what was initially thought to be pneumonia, Ruby was diagnosed with cancer at Parkland in December 1966. Rose indicated that the same type of cancer that affected Ruby's lungs was found in his brain, lymph nodes, liver, pancreas, pleura, ribs, and vertebra. He said that eight tumors were found in his brain, with the largest being three-fourths of an inch.

Rose told reporters that he could not definitively answer whether or not the tumors were present in Ruby's brain at the time he shot Oswald, but he indicated metastasis from the lungs to the brain could not have occurred prior to 1964 since X-rays at the county jail that year revealed that his lungs were clear. He added that he found no evidence of epilepsy or other brain abnormalities. Rose stated that his death certificate would note cancer as a contributing cause, but that the clot would likely have killed Ruby even if he had not been weakened by cancer.

== Later life ==
In 1966, Rose performed autopsies on the crew of American Flyers Flight 280 and testified about his findings in a hearing before the Civil Aeronautics Board.

From 1968 until his retirement in early 1992, Rose taught pathology at the University of Iowa. He was an expert witness in the 1977 trial of Robert Williams, who was indicted for the first-degree murder of 10-year-old Pamela Powers. In 1978, he served on the Forensic Pathology Panel of the United States House Select Committee on Assassinations. During their retirement, Rose and his wife worked as small claims court mediators in Johnson County, Iowa.

Suffering from late-onset dementia and Parkinson's disease, Rose lost his long-term memory and the ability to converse over the last year of his life. He contracted a near-fatal case of pneumonia and was bed-ridden prior to his death. On May 1, 2012, Rose died at the Oaknoll Retirement Residence in Iowa City, Iowa from complications due to Parkinson's disease.

== Views ==
Rose rejected the idea that there was a conspiracy to assassinate Kennedy and he supported the Warren Commission's conclusion that a single gunman shot the President. The New York Times characterized him as "an outspoken opponent of capital punishment". According to The Des Moines Register, Rose described himself as a "'visitor' to the Mennonite faith".

== See also ==
- Autopsy of John F. Kennedy
