= John H. Ebersole =

American pioneer in submarine medicine and radiation oncology, Captain US Navy

Captain John Henry Ebersole M.D., MC USN
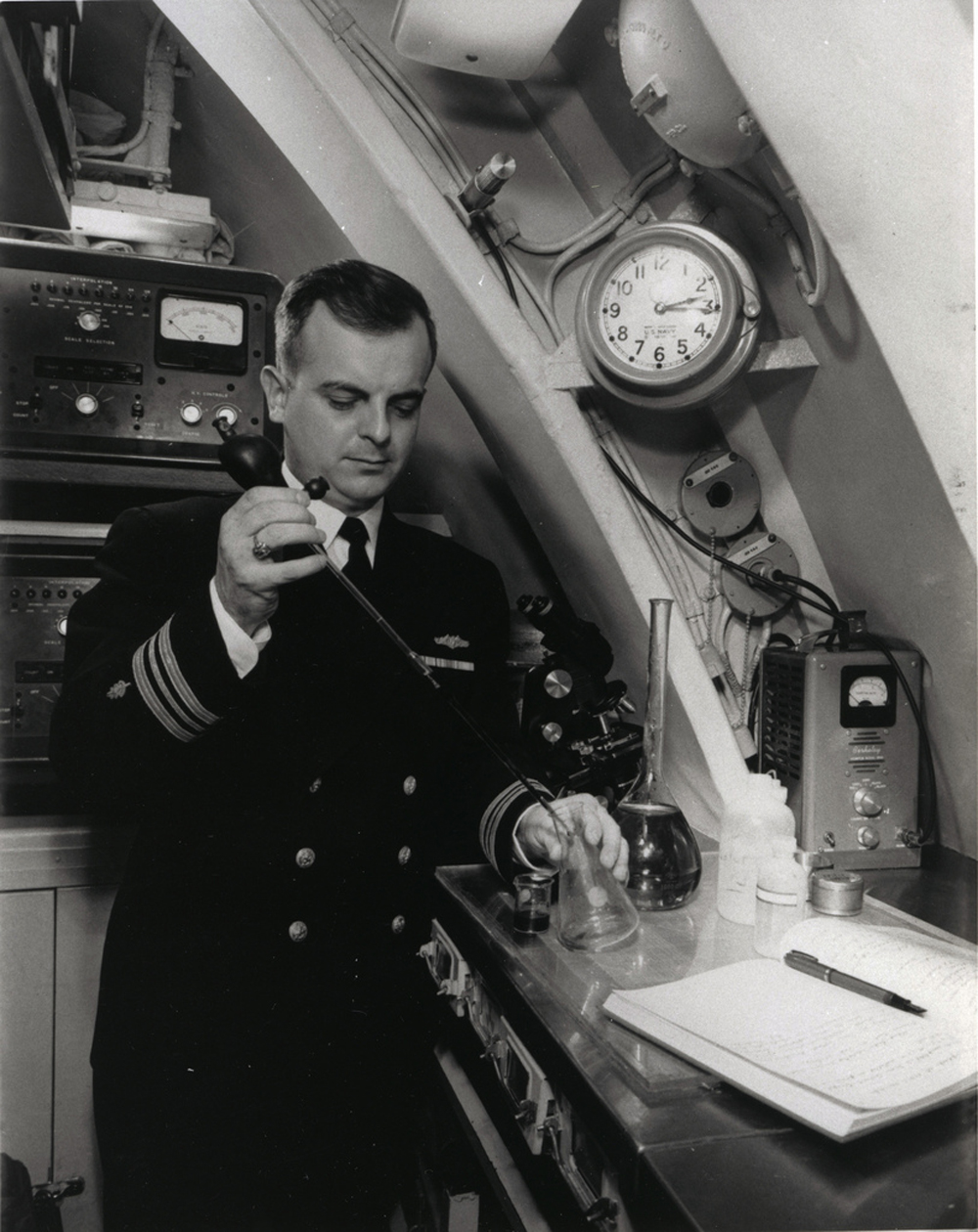
- Born: January 26, 1925; Sterling, Illinois
- Died: September 23, 1993 (aged 68); Lancaster, Pennsylvania
- Burial place: Arlington National Cemetery, Arlington, Virginia; Section: 8, Site: 9473
- Spouse: Marion E. Sherwood (1927 - 2004)
- Relatives: Catherine E. Walker, (daughter); Richard J. Ebersole (son); Michael J. Ebersole (son); William P. Ebersole (son); John H. Ebersole (son); Joseph E. Ebersole (son)
- Military career
- Allegiance: United States
- Branch: United States Navy
- Service years: 1948–1970
- Rank: Captain
- Nickname: "Jack"
- Units: Deep-Sea Diving School; Officer's Submarine School; U.S. Navy Medical Corps; USS Nautilus; USS Seawolf; Bethesda Naval Medical Center; Project Mercury, NASA; Office of Manned Space Flight, NASA
- Awards: U.S. Navy Presidential Unit Citation - USS Nautilus; U.S. Navy Unit Commendation – USS Seawolf; Gorgas Medal

John Henry Ebersole (26 January 1925 – 23 September 1993) was a pioneer in submarine medicine and radiation oncology, selected by Admiral Hyman G. Rickover to serve as medical officer aboard the US Navy's first two nuclear powered submarines, the USS Nautilus and the USS Seawolf. He was the radiologist for NASA that screened the Mercury Seven astronauts for Project Mercury. Ebersole was the radiologist responsible for the x-rays taken during the autopsy of John F. Kennedy on 22 November 1963 at Bethesda Naval Medical Center.

== Biography ==
Ebersole was born in 1925 at Sterling, Illinois. He grew up in northwestern Illinois.

Ebersole served for 24 years in the U.S. Navy Medical Corps. He was the first officer to serve aboard two nuclear submarines, the USS Nautilus and the USS Seawolf, being selected by Admiral Hyman G. Rickover as the medical officer for the crew. He worked with NASA on Project Mercury. Ebersole was assigned to Bethesda Naval Medical Center and was the radiologist for the autopsy of President John F. Kennedy. He was chief of radiation therapy, training director for nuclear medicine, and director of the Radiation Exposure Evaluation Laboratory. He became chief of diagnostic radiology and chief of radiology. After retirement from the Navy, Ebersole settled in Lancaster, Pennsylvania, where he established and directed the John Hale Steinman Cancer Center at Lancaster General Hospital. Upon retirement from medical practice, Ebersole pursue a lifelong passion in mystery novels and crime fiction. He traveled to England and attended conferences at Oxford University. He became adjunct faculty at Franklin and Marshall College and taught a detective fiction course in the EtCetera program. He was a founding member of the Orange Street Improbables, a group of mystery enthusiasts.

In 1993, Ebersole died at home after a brief illness at Lancaster, Pennsylvania. He was buried at Arlington National Cemetery, in plot: Sec: 8, Site: 9473.

== Education ==
Ebersole completed his undergraduate studies at Saint Ambrose College in Davenport, Iowa. In 2013, he was posthumously inducted into the Newman Central Catholic High School Hall of Fame at Sterling, Illinois. He attended the Indiana University School of Medicine and graduated in 1948, receiving his M.D. at the age 23.

== U.S. Navy career ==
Ebersole entered the U.S. Navy in July 1948 and trained in undersea medicine. As a future submarine doctor, Ebersole received extensive nuclear training. From 1949 to 1959, Ebersole was associated with nuclear submarines and had special training in nuclear physics at Duke University and at Oak Ridge, Tennessee. Ebersole was commissioned in the U.S. Navy and served on the USS Nautilus and the USS Seawolf, the first two nuclear submarines. Ebersole was selected by Admiral Hyman G. Rickover as the medical officer for the USS Nautilus, the first nuclear-powered submarine and served under commanding officer Commander Eugene Parks Wilkinson. Ebersole was a member of the launching crew for the USS Nautilus. He went on to serve as medical officer aboard the USS Seawolf, the second nuclear submarine for the U.S. Navy. Ebersole was the first person to serve on more than one nuclear powered vessel.

On 26 September 1957, President Dwight D. Eisenhower boarded the USS Seawolf at Narragansett Bay and was greeted by skipper Commander Richard B. Lanning and Rear Admiral Frederick B. Warder, Atlantic Fleet submarine force commander. The President was briefed by Ebersole regarding radiation exposure aboard the Seawolf. According to The New York Times report:

The President was briefed about controlled radiation exposure aboard nuclear-powered submarines. He received a film patch to wear and a tiny dosimeter to read. The medical officer, Lieutenant Commander John E. Ebersole of Sterling, Illinois, explained to the President that submariners in the new type craft get an average radiation dosage of about 200 milliroentgens a year, compared with an allowable industrial dose of about 300 a week. As he left the boat, the President jokingly told Admiral Warder to check on his film patch and "let me know if I had too much radiation." "I assure you, you won't have," the Admiral said."

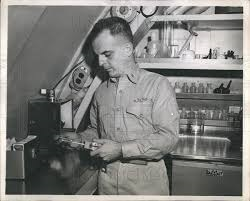
Ebersole aboard the Seawolf.

During his tour, the Seawolf set a new record of submergence for 60 days under the command of Captain Richard Boyer Laning. Captain Laning and the Seawolf crew were greeted upon return to port at New London, Connecticut, by Rear Admiral Hyman G. Rickover.

When the USS Seawolf was decommissioned, he started a residency in radiology at Bethesda Naval Hospital. In July 1963, he completed residency. He then became Chief of Radiation Therapy in the Medicine Section at Bethesda Naval Hospital.

=== Nuke School ===
Eventually, the Navy established a routine training program for what would be called Nuke School. The coursework for officers to be assigned to nuclear submarines and ships began at Reed College in Oregon with 24 weeks of training. Then they received 6 weeks of field training at the Atomic Energy Commission's Hanford plutonium production facilities in Washington. Next the candidates spent 5 weeks at the Nevada Test Site and the Sandia nuclear weapons laboratory in New Mexico. They finished up with 6 weeks of additional training at the Walter Reed Laboratory in Maryland.

== NASA ==
From 1958 to 1961, Ebersole worked with NASA during the training phase of the Project Mercury. Ebersole was part of the committee that evaluated the candidates selected for Project Mercury, the NASA Special Committee on Life Sciences. The committee included: Dr. William Randolph Lovelace II, Captain Norman L. Barr, Lieutenant Commander John H. Ebersole, Brigadier General Donald D. Flickinger, LtCol Robert H. Holmes, Dr. Wright Haskell Langham, Dr. Robert Burr Livingston, Dr. Orr Reynolds, and Boyd C. Myers II, committee secretary.

== John F. Kennedy autopsy ==
At the time of the President Kennedy autopsy, Ebersole was Commander, United States Navy, Assistant Chief of Radiology and head of the Radiology Division at Bethesda Naval Medical Center. Ebersole was the radiologist responsible for the x-rays taken during the autopsy of John F. Kennedy on 22 November 1963 at Bethesda Naval Medical Center. After the assassination of John F. Kennedy, Ebersole remained at Bethesda Naval Medical Center. In 1968, he was promoted to chairman of the radiology department and retired in 1970.

== Personal life ==
On 21 October 1948, John H. Ebersole, physician applied for a marriage license to wed Marion E. Sherwood, nurse. The couple were married on 30 October 1948 at St. Vincent de Paul church by Reverend M.J. Rouck in Bedford, Indiana. Ebersole was the son of Noah Ebersole, auto mechanic and Geraldine Kathryn McCormick, housewife. Marion was the daughter of Samuel J. Sherwood, estimator and Maybelle Elizabeth Lehay.

== Professional Service ==
- American Medical Association, member
- Society of Nuclear Medicine, member
- Health Physics Society, member
- Association of Military Surgeons of the United States, member
- American College of Radiology, diplomat and fellow
- American Board of Radiology, guest examiner, 1967, 1970- 1971.
- Illinois State Medical Society, Award of Merit, 1959

== Awards and honors ==
- U.S. Navy Presidential Unit Citation - USS Nautilus SSN-571
- U.S. Navy Unit Commendation - USS Seawolf SSN-575
- Royal Naval Society of Sweden, Merit Citation
- Gorgas Medal, 1958. "Ebersole, Medical Officer of the Seawolf, record-breaking atomic submarine, received the Gorgas Medal, scroll, and $500 for outstanding service in radiation protection of the crew. He received the award for outstanding work in preventive medicine in the field of radiobiology and nuclear submarine development."

== Publications ==
- Ebersole, J. H. (1952). Submarine atomic defense. Report 215. AD 224406. Naval Submarine Medical Research Laboratory. Groton, Connecticut.
- Ebersole, John H. (1957). Radiation Hygiene: Aboard Nuclear Submarines. American Industrial Hygiene Association Quarterly. 18(4): pages 305-311.
- Ebersole, J. H. (1957). Radiation exposure patterns aboard the USS Nautilus. New England Journal of Medicine. 256(2): pages 67–74.
- Ebersole, J. H. (1958). Submarine medicine on USS Nautilus and USS Seawolf. Proceedings of the Royal Society of Medicine. 51(2): page 63.
- Ebersole, J. H. (1959). Occupational health problems in space flight as experienced with nuclear power plants. Military Medicine. 124: pages 711-716.
- Ebersole, J. H. (1960). The new dimensions of submarine medicine. New England Journal of Medicine. 262: pages 599-610.
- Bottomley, William K., & Ebersole, J. H. (1966). Guidelines for dental care when patients receive radiation therapy to the head and neck. Oral Surgery, Oral Medicine, Oral Pathology. 22(2): pages 252-256.
- Royster, R. L., King, E. R., Ebersole, J., DeGiorgi, L. S., & Levitt, S. H. (1972). High dose, preoperative supervoltage irradiation for osteogenic sarcoma. American Journal of Roentgenology. 114(3): pages 536-543.
