= Godfrey McHugh =

United States Air Force general

Godfrey T. McHugh
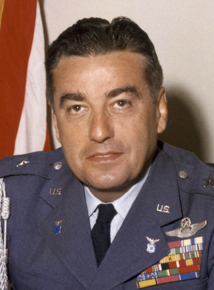
- McHugh in 1962
- Born: September 30, 1911; Brussels, Belgium
- Died: July 5, 1997 (aged 85); Palm Beach, Florida, US
- Burial place: Arlington National Cemetery
- Military career
- Allegiance: United States of America
- Branch: U.S. Army Air Forces; United States Air Force
- Service years: 1942 - 1967
- Rank: Brigadier General
- Conflicts: World War II
- Awards: Legion of Merit

Godfrey T. McHugh (September 30, 1911 – July 5, 1997) was a United States Air Force general and served as military aide to President John F. Kennedy.

== Early years ==
McHugh was born in Brussels, Belgium, to American parents. He received a baccalaureate in science and languages from the University of Paris in 1929. He was an oil production supervisor for the West Texas Production Company in Fort Worth, Texas from 1938 to 1942. He dated Jacqueline Bouvier (who later married John F. Kennedy and became First Lady of the United States).

== Military career ==
After the U.S. entered World War II, McHugh joined the U.S. Army Air Forces as a captain on January 31, 1942, and received pilot training. From February 1942 to 1943 he was a planning officer with the Air War Plans Division of the War Department General Staff. From 1943 to 1946 was executive of the U.S. Air Force Scientific Advisory Board assigned to General H.H. Arnold, commanding general U.S. Army Air Forces. He also served in both the European and Pacific Theaters with the Scientific Advisory Board. He was with the Army General Staff Intelligence Foreign Liaison Office for a year, graduated from the Army General Staff Strategic Military School in 1947. Then he became assistant executive and senior aide to General Hoyt S. Vandenberg, chief of staff, U.S. Air Force, from 1948 to 1953. McHugh attended the National War College from 1953 to 1954. During World War II, he rose to the rank of lieutenant colonel and was stationed in the European and Pacific Theater. He was awarded the Legion of Merit for his wartime service.

== Kennedy Administration ==
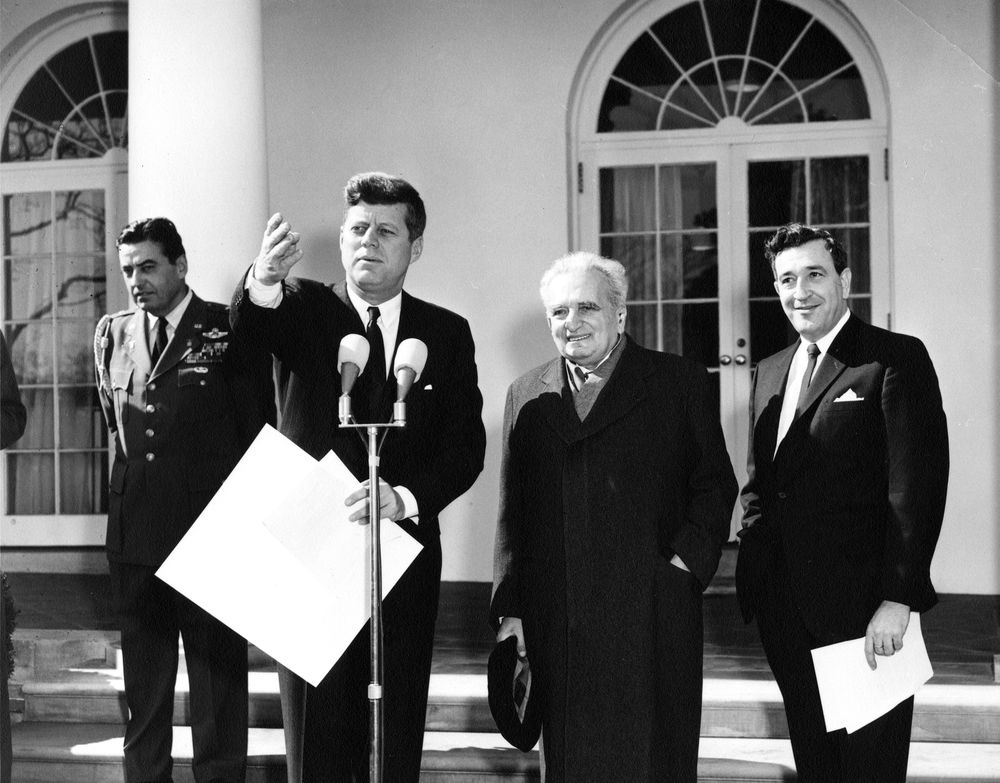
Brig Gen McHugh (far left) is present for the 1963 award of the National Medal of Science to Theodore von Kármán.

He became Air Force Aide to President Kennedy and was promoted to Brigadier General in 1961. As military aide to the President, his duties included supervising Air Force One. He very often rode in the middle of the front seat of the Presidential State Car while transporting the President. While he was in Dallas, Texas during the John F. Kennedy assassination, McHugh was moved farther back in the motorcade that day rather than riding in the President's car. He was present at Parkland Memorial Hospital as doctors attempted to save the President’s life.

After Kennedy's death, McHugh stood guard by Kennedy's body on Air Force One as the President's body was returned to Washington, D.C.

In a 1978 oral history interview that McHugh gave to the John F. Kennedy Presidential Library (that was withheld from the public until 2009), McHugh provided detailed statements that once Kennedy's body was back on-board Air Force One he did not know that Lyndon Johnson was also on board. Due to safety concerns that there was a conspiracy, Jacqueline Kennedy's repeated requests, and the fact that the plane's interior cabin was quite warm, McHugh had requested that the plane take off. When the plane still had not taken off, McHugh went forward to again ask pilot James Swindal why the plane had not taken off and he was told that Johnson did not want the plane to take off yet. McHugh went to find Johnson and he soon found Johnson in a bathroom with Johnson saying repeatedly, "They're going to get us all. It's a plot. It's a plot. It's going to get us all." According to the General, Johnson "was hysterical, sitting down on the john there alone in this thing." In a documented interview the previous week in 1978 McHugh had also stated to the House Select Committee on Assassinations investigator Mark Flanagan the same basic account of what he witnessed.

=== Jordan Marsh incident ===
Full recording of the telephone call between McHugh and Kennedy; July 25, 1963.

In the summer of 1963, Jacqueline Kennedy was at the Kennedy family compound in Massachusetts while she was pregnant. Air Force personnel became concerned that if Mrs. Kennedy were to deliver the child at the Otis Air Force Base hospital, that the maternity ward furniture would be unsatisfactory for the newborn child of the President and First Lady. The Air Force then spent $5,000.00 ($44,000 in 2021) of taxpayer money at Jordan Marsh & Company to purchase new furniture, and allowed media photographs of a U.S. Navy aide standing next to the purchase. After the photos made their way into the Washington Post, an irate President Kennedy telephoned McHugh and ordered him to have the furniture returned.

== Later years ==
McHugh married Lillian Triplett Fall in 1967. The couple retired to Palm Beach, Florida in 1986.

General McHugh died in Palm Beach in 1997 and is buried in Arlington National Cemetery.

== Awards ==
- Legion of Merit
- Air Force Commendation Medal
- Army Commendation Medal
- American Campaign Medal
- European-African-Middle Eastern Campaign Medal
- World War II Victory Medal
- Army of Occupation Medal
- National Defense Service Medal with star
- Air Force Longevity Service Ribbon with four bronze oak leaf clusters

== Dates of rank ==
Rank	Date
Second Lieutenant	NEVER HELD
First Lieutenant	NEVER HELD
Captain	31 January 1942
Major	3 September 1942
Lieutenant Colonel	10 March 1944
Colonel	
Brigadier General	1961
