= Floyd Boring =

American Secret Service agent who served with five US Presidents (1915–2008)

Floyd Murray Boring (June 25, 1915 – February 1, 2008) was an American Secret Service agent (1943–1967) who served with five US Presidents. He was also present and took part in the gunfight that foiled an assassination attempt on Harry S. Truman.

== Truman assassination attempt ==
On the afternoon of 1 November 1950, Truman was taking a nap at Blair House, where he was living while The White House, across Pennsylvania Avenue, was being renovated. Boring was stationed outside Blair House with several uniformed White House guards, while two Secret Service agents were posted inside. Around 2:00 Oscar Collazo and Griselio Torresola started to fire at Blair House. Boring, drawing his .38-caliber Colt pistol, known as a Detective's Special, fired a bullet through the hat of one of the gunmen, Oscar Collazo, grazing his scalp. Collazo was also shot in the chest, and bullets grazed his nose and an ear. He was captured at the entrance to Blair House as Boring kicked his pistol away from his side.

== Other Presidents ==
As well as Truman, Boring also worked with Franklin D. Roosevelt, Dwight D. Eisenhower, John F. Kennedy and Lyndon B. Johnson. He was with President Franklin D. Roosevelt when he died at Warm Springs, Georgia, in 1945, and accompanied his body to the funeral at Hyde Park, New York. He was not with President Kennedy's Secret Service detail in Dallas when Kennedy was assassinated. According to author Vince Palamara, Mr. Boring played a pivotal role in the security planning of Kennedy's trip to Dallas, as he was in charge of the advance arrangements. As well as the assassination, Boring also dealt with a frightening moment on the Potomac River one day when Truman struggled while swimming off his yacht.

In 1965, Boring was replaced by Roy Kellerman as "deputy special agent in charge" and assigned to Secret Service headquarters as an inspector. He retired in 1967 and entered private security work.

== Personal life and death ==
His wife, Ruth, died in 2005. He had two daughters with her, Judith Orzell and Kate Elliott. On February 1, 2008 he died of congestive heart failure. He is survived by both his daughters and his granddaughter, Kay.
