= Roy Kellerman =

U.S. Secret Service agent (1915–1984)

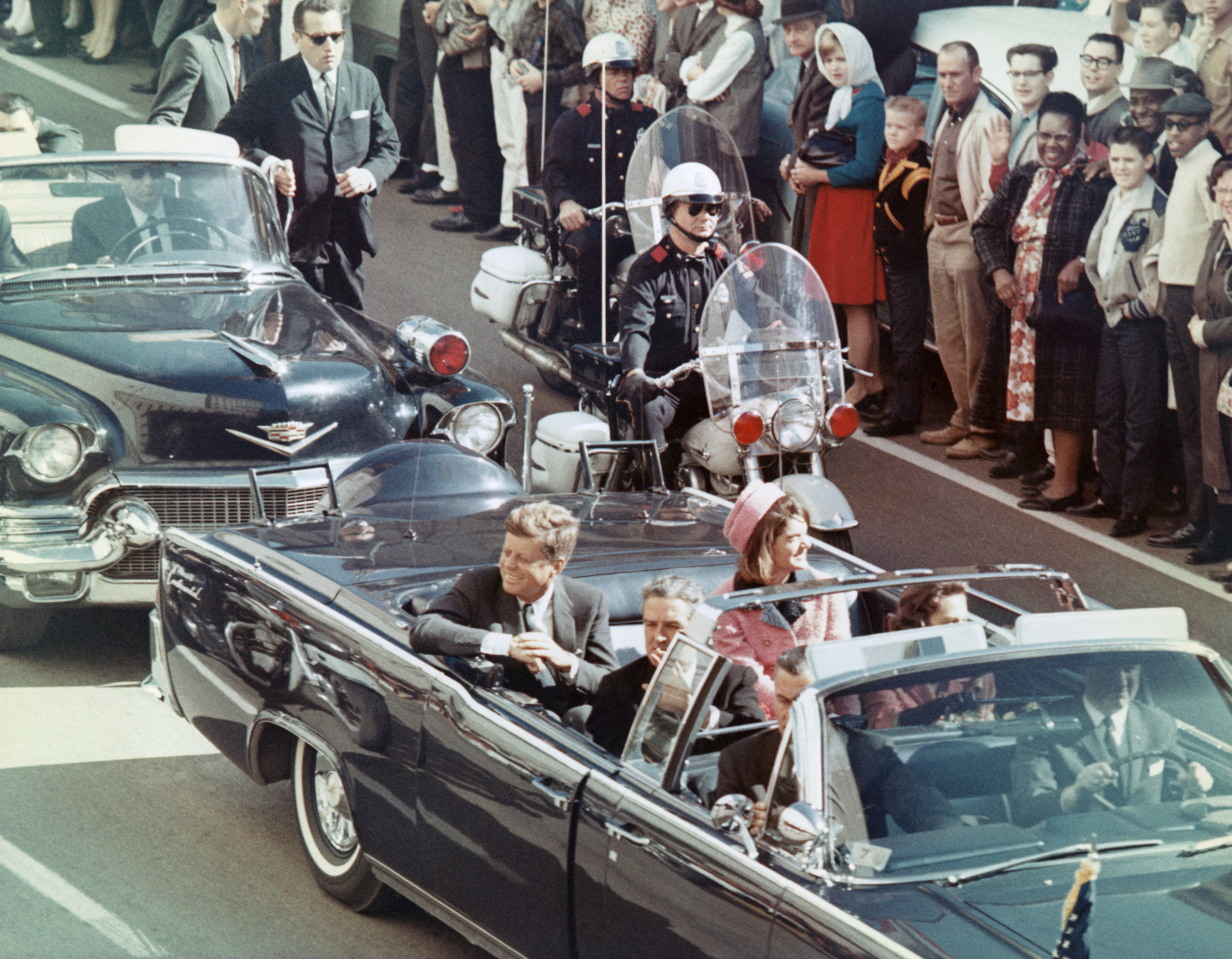
- The Presidential limousine shortly before Kennedy's assassination. Kellerman was in the front passenger seat of the car
- Born: Roy Herman Kellerman; March 14, 1915; Macomb County, Michigan, U.S.
- Died: March 22, 1984 (aged 69); St. Petersburg, Florida, U.S.
- Resting place: Memorial Park Cemetery; St. Petersburg, Florida, U.S.

Roy Herman Kellerman (March 14, 1915 – March 22, 1984) was a U.S. Secret Service senior agent who was assigned to protect United States President John F. Kennedy when he was assassinated on November 22, 1963, in Dallas. In his reports, later testimony and interviews, Kellerman outlines in detail his role in the immediate aftermath of the assassination.

== History ==
Kellerman, a New Baltimore, Michigan native, graduated from high school in 1933 and worked for the Dodge division of Chrysler sporadically from 1935 until 1937 when he was sworn in as a trooper for the Michigan State Police. Kellerman joined the Secret Service in Detroit just before Christmas 1941, transferring temporarily to the White House detail in March 1942 and permanently one month later. In 1965, Kellerman was promoted to "deputy special agent in charge", replacing Floyd Boring. He retired from the Secret Service in 1968 as an assistant administrator.

Kellerman died in St. Petersburg, Florida, on March 22, 1984, eight days after his 69th birthday.

== Assassination of John F. Kennedy ==
As the Assistant Special Agent in Charge of November 22, 1963, Shift Team No. 3, Kellerman was riding in the front passenger seat of the presidential limousine. The driver was Secret Service Agent William Greer. Like all Secret Service agents assigned to protect the President of the United States, Kellerman was trained to use his own body as a shield, taking a bullet if necessary in the line of duty.

Kellerman along with Secret Service agents William Greer, Clint Hill, and Rufus Youngblood, provided testimony to the Warren Commission in Washington, D.C., on March 9, 1964.

Kellerman testified, "I turned around to find out what happened when two additional shots rang out and the President slumped into Mrs. Kennedy's lap and Governor Connally fell to Mrs. Connally's lap." He further testified to the Warren Commission that he first heard what sounded like a "pop" or a "firecracker" somewhere to his right and about five seconds later the assassination then ended in a "flurry of shells" coming into the limousine. He described the final shots as "like a plane going through a sound barrier; bang bang". During his testimony he said: "If President Kennedy had from all reports four wounds, Governor Connally three, there have got to be more than three shots, gentlemen.". Kellerman stated that at the hospital he observed that a part of Kennedy's right rear skull was missing, with a hole measuring 5 inches in diameter.

The House Select Committee on Assassinations declared in 1979 that "the Secret Service was deficient in the performance of its duties" at the time of the assassination, and that President Kennedy did not receive adequate protection in Dallas. Regarding the conduct of Secret Service Agent Roy Kellerman, the HSCA noted:

No actions were taken by the agent in the right front seat of the Presidential limousine [Roy Kellerman] to cover the President with his body, although it would have been consistent with Secret Service procedure for him to have done so. The primary function of the agent was to remain at all times in close proximity to the President in the event of such emergencies.

According to an interview given in 1981 after John Hinckley, Jr.'s attempt to assassinate President Reagan in 1981, Kellerman did not believe there was a conspiracy to assassinate Kennedy. However, in 1994, Vanity Fair published an article by Anthony Summers and Robbyn Swan in which they quoted Kellerman's widow, June, as stating he "accepted that there was a conspiracy." Additionally, one of Kellerman's daughters told researcher Harold Weisberg in the 1970s that "I hope the day will come when these men [Kellerman and Greer] will be able to say what they've told their families".

== In popular culture ==
In the 2013 film Parkland, actor Tom Welling played the role of Kellerman.
