= William Greer =

U.S. Secret Service agent (1909–1985)

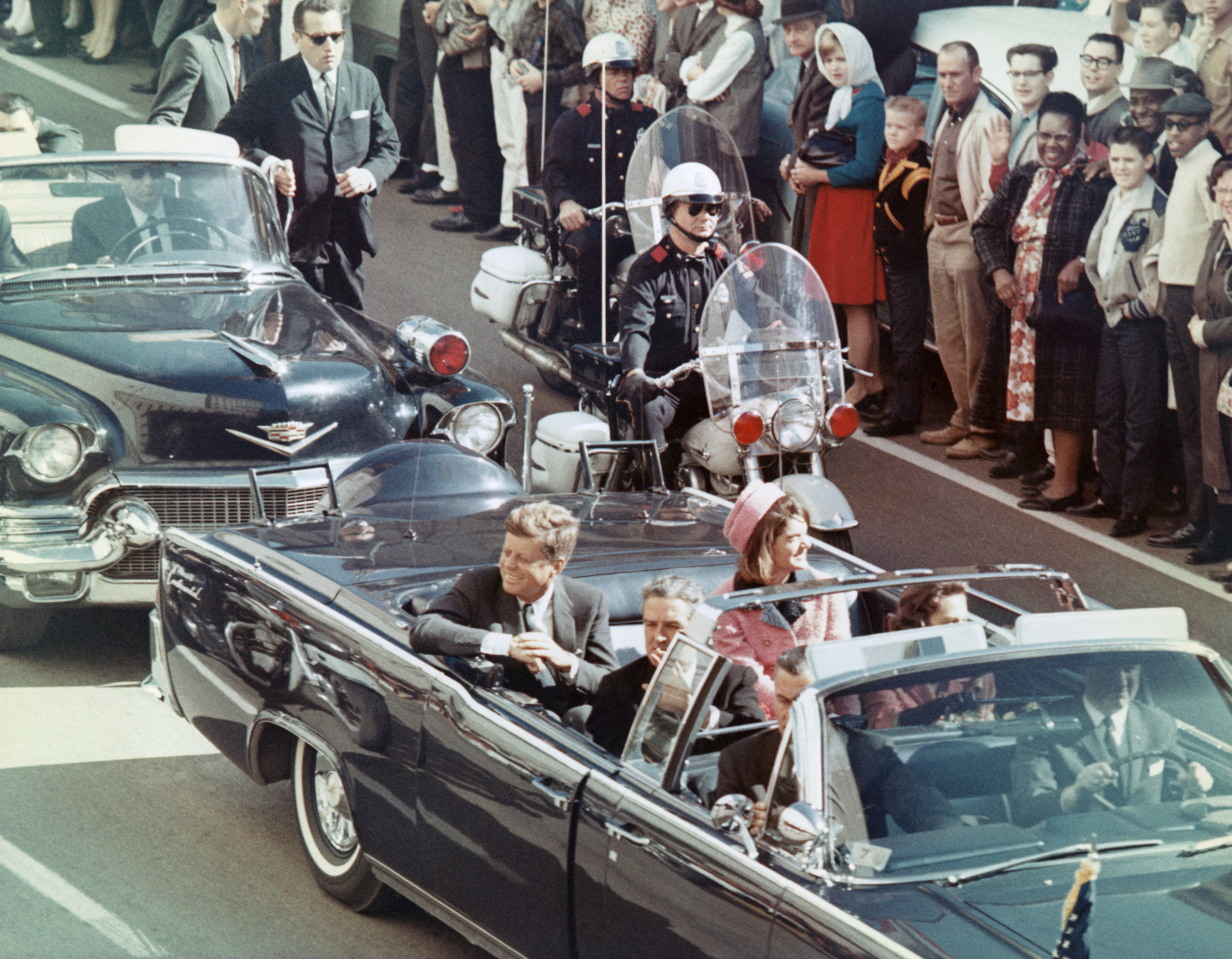
- The Presidential limousine shortly before Kennedy's assassination. Greer is in the driver's seat, with Roy Kellerman in the front passenger seat.
- Born: William Robert Greer; September 22, 1909; Stewartstown, County Tyrone, Ireland
- Died: February 23, 1985 (aged 75); Waynesville, North Carolina, U.S.
- Resting place: Green Hill Cemetery, Waynesville

William Robert Greer (September 22, 1909 – February 23, 1985) was an Irish-born agent of the U.S. Secret Service, best known for driving President John F. Kennedy's presidential limousine through Dealey Plaza in Dallas on November 22, 1963, when the president was assassinated.

== History ==
William Robert Greer was born on September 22, 1909, on a farm in Stewartstown, County Tyrone, Ireland (later Northern Ireland), and emigrated to the United States in 1929. He worked for over a decade as a chauffeur and servant to several wealthy families, including the Lodge family in Boston and a family in Dobbs Ferry, New York. During World War II, Greer enlisted in the U.S. Navy and was assigned to the presidential yacht in May 1944. After his discharge in 1945, he joined the United States Secret Service on October 1 of that year. In 2013, it was reported that Greer had been a member of the Drumbonaway lodge of the Orange Order while living in Ireland.

Greer's duties brought him into close contact with Kennedy, and he can be seen in several photographs with the Kennedy family. He chauffeured the president on many occasions, including in Dallas. His actions during the assassination have been the subject of speculation and criticism. Greer testified before the Warren Commission on March 9, 1964. He said that he heard three shots and initially thought the first was a motorcycle backfiring, so did not react. He heard a second shot about three or four seconds later, prompting him to turn around, when he noticed that Governor Connally had been wounded. Greer described the second and third shots as occurring "simultaneously, one behind the other". After arriving at Parkland Hospital, Greer helped bring Kennedy into the emergency room.

According to Greer's nephew, Ken Torrens, when he asked Greer if he thought Oswald was guilty he replied "No comment" and that "I’m not allowed to talk about it".

Greer retired from the Secret Service on disability in 1966 due to a stomach ulcer that worsened following the Kennedy assassination. In 1973, he relocated to Waynesville, North Carolina, where he died of cancer on February 23, 1985, at the age of 75.

== Analysis and criticism ==
Secret Service procedures in place at the time did not allow Greer to take action without orders from senior agent Roy Kellerman, who sat to his right. Kellerman later said that he ordered Greer to leave the motorcade line after realizing they had been hit, but that Greer turned to look at Kennedy before accelerating.

No agents were disciplined for their performance during the shooting. Jacqueline Kennedy privately criticized the agents' response, particularly Greer's, and compared him to the Kennedy children's nanny. According to William Manchester, Greer later apologized to Kennedy and expressed regret that he had not reacted sooner.
