= United States House Select Committee on Assassinations =

Former assassination investigation committee

The Select Committee on Assassinations
Select committee
- United States House of Representatives; 95th Congress

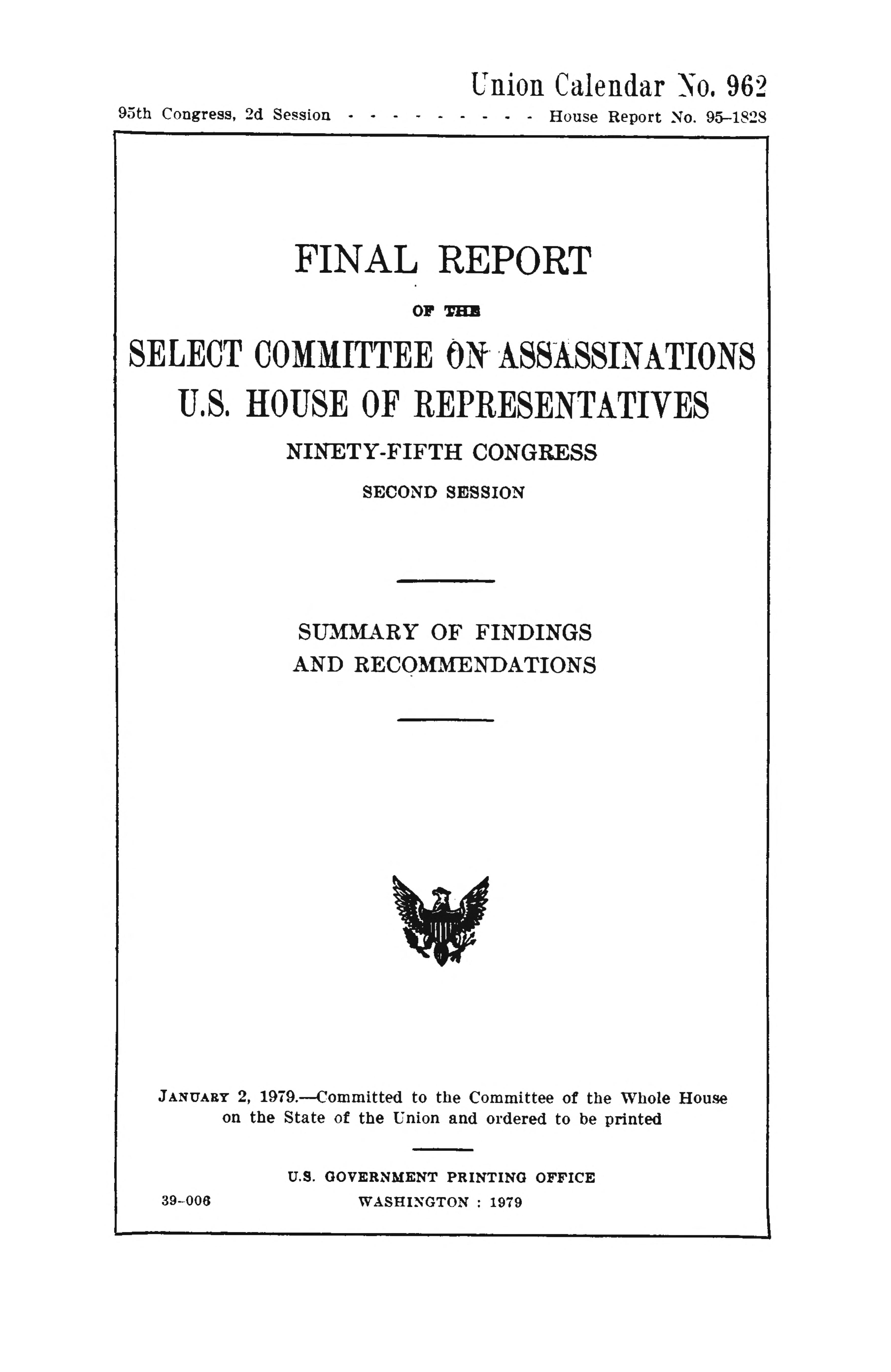
- Title page of the Final Report, published by the U.S. Government Printing Office

History
- Formed: First creation September 15, 1976 (by HR 1540, 94th Congress); Second creation January 3, 1977 (Enacted on February 2nd by HR 222, 95th Congress)
- Disbanded: January 3, 1977 (End of 94th Congress); January 3, 1979 (End of 95th Congress)

Leadership
- Chair: Louis Stokes (D)
- Ranking Member: Samuel L. Devine (R)

Structure
- Seats: 12
- Political parties: Majority (8): Democratic (8); Minority (4): Republican (4)

Jurisdiction
- Purpose: To conduct a "full and complete investigation of the circumstances surrounding the deaths of President John F. Kennedy and Dr. Martin Luther King, Jr."

Subcommittees
- Subcommittee on the Assassination of Martin Luther King, Jr.; Chaired by Walter E. Fauntroy (D); Subcommittee on the Assassination of John F. Kennedy; Chaired by Richardson Preyer (D)

Website
- www.archives.gov/research/jfk/select-committee-report

The United States House of Representatives Select Committee on Assassinations (HSCA) was established on September 15, 1976, by U.S. House Resolution 1540 to investigate the assassinations of John F. Kennedy and Martin Luther King Jr. in 1963 and 1968, respectively. The select committee was first formed by the 94th United States Congress, and expired at the end of the 95th Congress.

The HSCA completed its investigation in 1978 and issued its final report in 1979, which concluded that Kennedy "was probably assassinated as a result of a conspiracy." In addition to acoustic analysis of a police channel dictabelt recording, the HSCA also commissioned numerous other scientific studies of assassination-related evidence that corroborate the Warren Commission's findings. However, the HSCA challenged the Warren Commission's conclusion that Lee Harvey Oswald was the only shooter, while stating that it was "unable to identify the other gunman or the extent of the conspiracy." The HSCA likewise concluded, based on circumstantial evidence, that there was a "likelihood" King was also assassinated "as a result of a conspiracy." The two-year inquiry cost $5.8 million. In December 1978, the HSCA recommended that the Department of Justice review its findings to decide if further investigation was merited.

The HSCA found that although the Commission and the different agencies and departments examining Kennedy's assassination performed in good faith and were thorough in their investigation of Oswald, they performed with "varying degrees of competency" and the search for possible conspiracy was inadequate. The HSCA determined, based on available evidence, that the probable conspiracy did not involve the governments of Cuba or the Soviet Union. The committee also stated that the conspiracy did not involve any organized crime group, anti-Castro group, nor the FBI, CIA, or Secret Service. The committee found that it could not exclude the possibility that individual members of the national syndicate of organized crime or anti-Castro Cubans were involved in a probable conspiracy to assassinate President Kennedy. However, some members of the committee would later state their personal belief that one of those groups was involved in the assassination, with Representative Floyd Fithian believing that the Kennedy assassination was orchestrated by members of organized crime.

In a memorandum written to the House Judiciary Committee in 1988 by Criminal Division Assistant Attorney General William F. Weld, the recommendations of the HSCA report were formally reviewed and a conclusion of active investigations was reported. In light of investigative reports from the FBI's Technical Services Division and the National Academy of Sciences Committee determining that "reliable acoustic data do not support a conclusion that there was a second gunman" in the Kennedy assassination, and that all investigative leads known to the Justice Department for both assassinations had been "exhaustively pursued", the Department concluded "that no persuasive evidence can be identified to support the theory of a conspiracy in either the assassination of President Kennedy or the assassination of Dr. King."

== Historic context ==
Several forces contributed to the formation of the HSCA. With the rapidly growing body of assassination conspiracy material, public trust in the findings of the Warren Commission report was declining. The Hart-Schweiker and Church Committee hearings had recently revealed CIA ties to other assassinations and assassination attempts and illegal actions from federal administration (FBI and IRS). The Church Commission also conducted an investigation into the assassination of John F. Kennedy in 1963, concluding that the federal agencies the FBI and the CIA had failed in their duties and responsibilities and that the investigation into the assassination had been deficient.

There was also significant public interest after a video segment of the Zapruder film was first shown on TV on March 6, 1975, during the ABC late-night television show Good Night America, after being stored by Life magazine out of view for almost twelve years. The footage showed the president's head recoiling violently backwards inside the presidential limousine during the fatal shooting as Lee Harvey Oswald was more than 80 yards behind. The public, having more and more difficulty accepting the conclusions of the Warren Commission report, led members of Congress to ask for new investigations into the assassination, within the framework of a new Commission of Inquiry.

== Formation ==
In September 1976, the United States House of Representatives voted 280–65 to establish the Select Committee on Assassinations (HSCA) in order to investigate the assassinations of John F. Kennedy and Martin Luther King Jr.

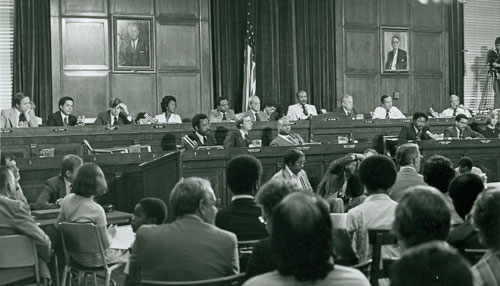
Meeting of the House Select Committee on Assassinations. Rep. Burke (upper left), Rep. Fauntroy (second from upper left), and Rep. Stokes (fifth from upper left), listen to witness testimony.

The committee was both controversial and divided among itself. The first chairman, Thomas N. Downing of Virginia, retired in January 1977 and was replaced by Henry B. Gonzalez on February 2, 1977. Gonzalez and Chief Counsel Richard A. Sprague had irreconcilable disagreements over control of the committee, budget, and investigative techniques, ending with Gonzalez's resignation. Sprague also resigned, in part to increase the chances of Congress voting to reconstitute the HSCA for the new two-year congressional term. Sprague's like-minded deputy Robert K. Tanenbaum similarly resigned shortly thereafter. Louis Stokes replaced Gonzalez as chairman, and G. Robert Blakey was appointed as Chief Counsel and Staff Director to replace Sprague.

Former New York police detective and organized crime expert Ralph Salerno was brought on as a consultant in the investigation of organized crime and its relation to the Kennedy assassination. In this capacity he produced a report for the committee.

=== Members, 95th Congress ===
Majority	Minority
Louis Stokes, Ohio, Chair; Richardson Preyer, North Carolina; Walter E. Fauntroy, District of Columbia; Yvonne Brathwaite Burke, California; Christopher Dodd, Connecticut; Harold Ford, Sr., Tennessee; Floyd Fithian, Indiana; Robert W. Edgar, Pennsylvania	Samuel L. Devine, Ohio, Ranking Member; Stewart McKinney, Connecticut; Charles Thone, Nebraska; Harold S. Sawyer, Michigan

Members of the Subcommittee on the Assassination of Martin Luther King Jr., 95th Congress

Majority	Minority
Walter E. Fauntroy, District of Columbia, Chair; Harold Ford, Sr., Tennessee; Floyd Fithian, Indiana; Robert W. Edgar, Pennsylvania	Stewart McKinney, Connecticut
Ex officio
Louis Stokes, Ohio	Samuel L. Devine, Ohio

Members of the Subcommittee on the Assassination of John F. Kennedy, 95th Congress

Majority	Minority
Richardson Preyer, North Carolina, Chair; Yvonne Brathwaite Burke, California; Christopher Dodd, Connecticut	Charles Thone, Nebraska; Harold S. Sawyer, Michigan
Ex officio
Louis Stokes, Ohio	Samuel L. Devine, Ohio

== Investigations ==
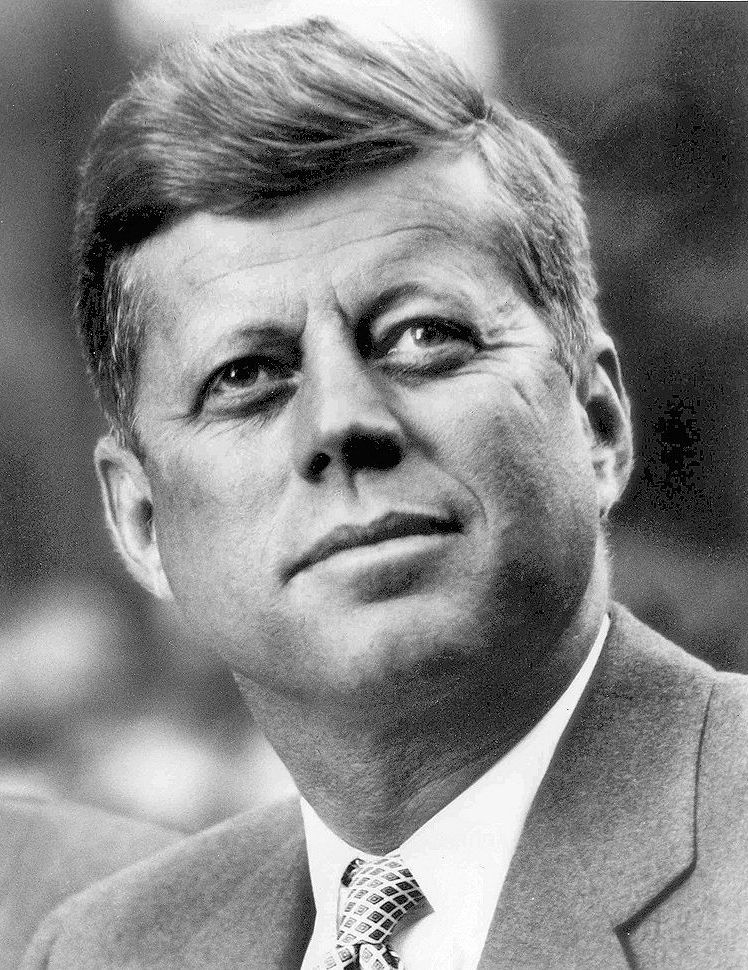
The HSCA investigated the assassinations of John F. Kennedy (left) and Martin Luther King Jr. (right)

The HSCA commissioned a number of expert scientific studies to re-investigate the physical evidence of the JFK assassination. In comparison to witness testimony and government documents, the committee felt that such investigations would particularly benefit from the scientific advances of the fifteen years since the Warren Commission. Several lines of inquiry were followed to both reaffirm the single shooter/single-bullet theory as well as to disprove specific conspiracy theory allegations. The HSCA concluded that these scientific studies of assassination-related evidence do "not preclude the possibility of two gunmen firing at the President."

=== Ballistic analysis ===
Forensic analysis confirmed that the mostly-intact stretcher bullet, bullet fragments from the presidential limo and the three cartridge casings from the sniper's nest were all fired from Oswald's rifle to the exclusion of all others. A technique using neutron activation analysis (NAA), a form of what has become known as comparative bullet-lead analysis (CBLA), was used to analyse the bullet lead from the JFK assassination. It revealed that it was highly likely that only two lead bullets were the source of all the following pieces of evidence: the mostly-intact stretcher bullet, fragments found in the presidential limousine's front seat and rug, fragments recovered from JFK's brain autopsy and fragments recovered from Governor Connally's wrist. Whether CBLA data can be used to actually exclude the possibility that there were fragments from more than two bullets in the wounds and the car has been the subject of controversy. (See single bullet theory)

Additionally, the location of the shooter (at the 6th floor Texas School Book Depository window) was determined using trajectory analysis. The origin of the rifle bullets was calculated using the location of the presidential limousine and its occupants combined with the bullet wounds found on the president and governor.

=== Photographic analysis ===
A team of photographic experts was used to answer several questions related to the photographic evidence of the case. Forensic anthropologists as well as photographic and radiographic experts, based on unique anatomical details, verified that JFK's autopsy photos and x-rays were only of the late president. Forensic anthropologists were also used to verify that all relevant photographs of Lee Harvey Oswald were of only one person. They verified that the backyard photos (showing Oswald holding the rifle used to kill the president) depicted the same rifle found in the Texas school book depository building after the crime. The panel of photographic experts were also used to verify the authenticity of the assassination-related photos and to analyze for any tampering or fakery; none was detected.

=== Forensic Pathology Panel ===
The HSCA's Forensic Pathology Panel included Michael Baden, John I. Coe, Joseph H. Davis, George S. Loquvam, Charles S. Petty, Earl Rose, Werner Spitz, Cyril Wecht, and James T. Weston.

With the benefit of authenticated photographs, x-rays and notes from the Kennedy autopsy, a nine-doctor panel of expert pathologists reviewed and corroborated the Warren Commission's medical findings. Although the HSCA medical panel was critical of the thoroughness and methodology of the original autopsy, they concurred, although Cyril Wecht dissented, with the Warren Commission's conclusion that two, and only two bullet wounds entered from above and behind (the direction of Oswald in the Book Depository). Their conclusion that the President was struck by a bullet that entered in the right rear of the head near the cowlick area and exited from the right front side of the head differed from a diagram in the Warren Commission's report showing this entrance wound low in the back of the head.

=== Fingerprint and handwriting analysis ===
The authenticity of several fingerprints and a palm print found on assassination-related materials was reaffirmed by a fingerprint expert. Lee Harvey Oswald's prints were found on the trigger guard and underside of the Mannlicher–Carcano rifle used to shoot the president, the brown paper container used to transport the rifle, several cardboard boxes in the sniper's nest and on the magazine order form to purchase the rifle.

In addition, dozens of documents were analyzed by a panel of three handwriting experts who verified that "the signatures and handwriting purported to be by Oswald are consistently that of one person." These include such incriminating items as the envelope and order form used to purchase the rifle, the application forms to rent the PO Box that the rifle was delivered to, and the notated backyard photo depicting Oswald holding the rifle.

=== Secret Services Actions analysis ===
The Department of Justice, the FBI, the CIA and the Warren Commission were all criticized for the quality of the investigations carried out and for the way they informed the Warren Commission.

The Secret Service was criticized for the weak protection of the president, which was weakened between the parade in Houston on November 21 and Dallas on November 22, 1963. During the parade in Houston, the HSCA noted that 33 motorcyclists – including 6 on the flanks of the same presidential limousine- were deployed throughout the journey, which was not the case in Dallas 24 hours later. The HSCA reported that in its own report that : "(104) The Secret Service's alteration's of the Dallas Police Department's original motorcycle deployment plan prevented the use of maximum safety precautions."

=== Dictabelt audio recording ===
Although the HSCA had prepared a draft report confirming the Warren Commission's single shooter theory and finding no evidence of conspiracy, at the eleventh hour, the committee was swayed by a since-disputed acoustic analysis of a dictabelt police channel recording. This acoustic analysis of the dictabelt recording by the firm Bolt, Beranek and Newman Inc. concluded that four shots were fired at the president, thus causing the HSCA to reverse its earlier position and report "that Kennedy was probably assassinated as a result of a conspiracy." In terms of scientific evidence, the HSCA acknowledged that the existence of a second shooter was only supported by this acoustic analysis.

As recommended by the HSCA, the Justice Department reviewed those findings through the FBI's Technical Services Division and by contracting the National Academy of Sciences, which specially appointed the Committee on Ballistic Acoustics (CBA). Both the FBI and CBA analyzed the acoustic data and BBN's scientific methodology and concluded that their findings were mistaken. Although there has been some recent back-and-forth between different researchers, the HSCA's acoustic analysis is widely considered to be discredited.

== Witness auditions ==
Unlike the Warren Commission and the FBI who had concluded that there was a minor interest in their investigation of this aspect of the life of the former marine without digging further on the grounds that their investigation had not revealed the presence of Lee Harvey Oswald. At 544 Camp Street17, the HSCA revealed on the contrary several witnesses who confirmed the presence of Lee Harvey Oswald within the illegal branch of the CIA, including the brothers Allen and Daniel Campbell, former marines recruited by Guy Banister, his secretary Delphine Roberts or his own brother again.

In the address book of Lee Harvey Oswald, the coordinates of several notorious anti-Castroists were also found.

The committee also found a connection between Lee Harvey Oswald and David Ferrie. The committee indicated that Lee Harvey Oswald and David Ferrie knew each other since 1955 and their actions in the civil air patrol.

The HSCA did not interview the personal physician of John F Kennedy, the doctor Georges Burkley who was never interviewed by the Warren Commission.

== Conclusions ==
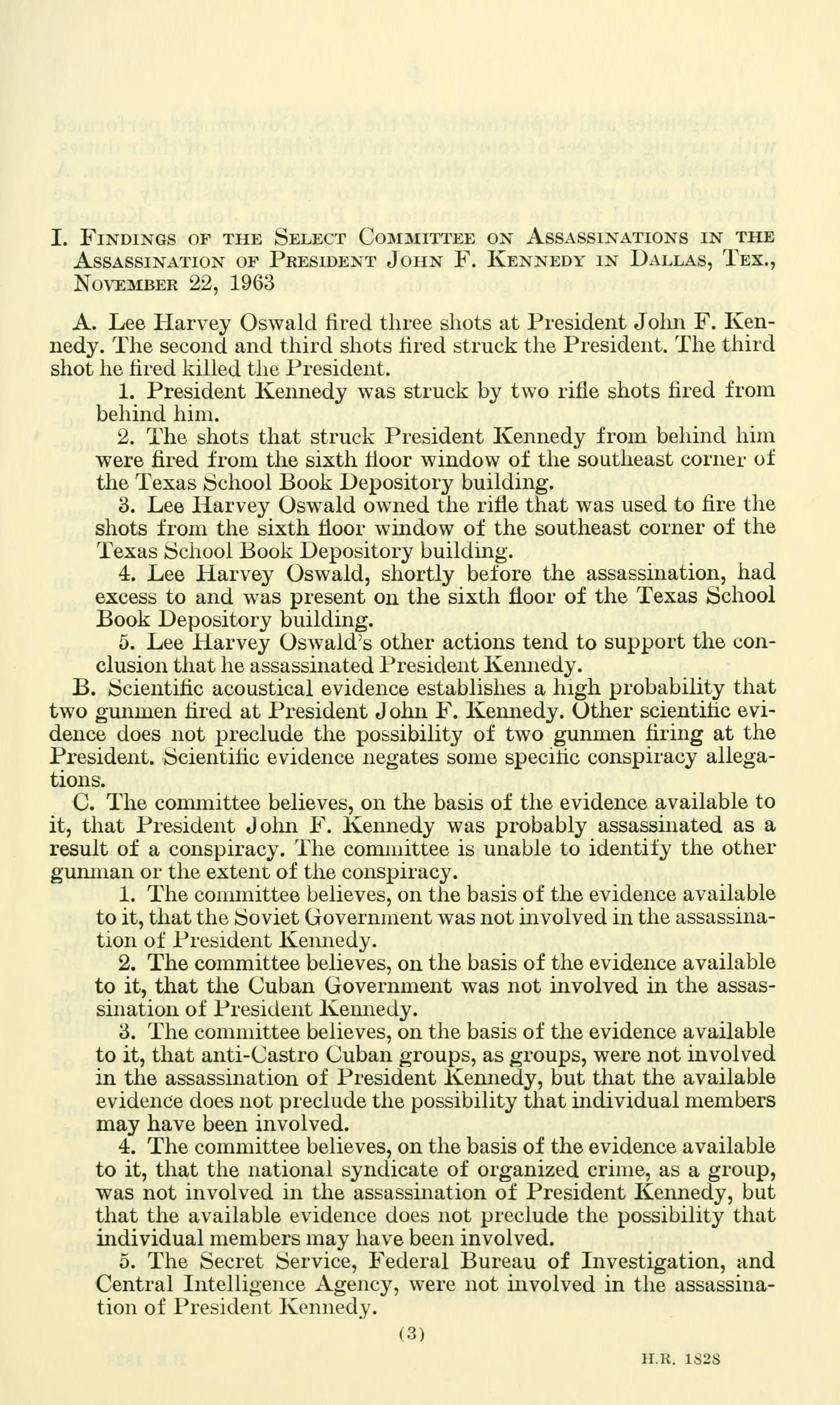
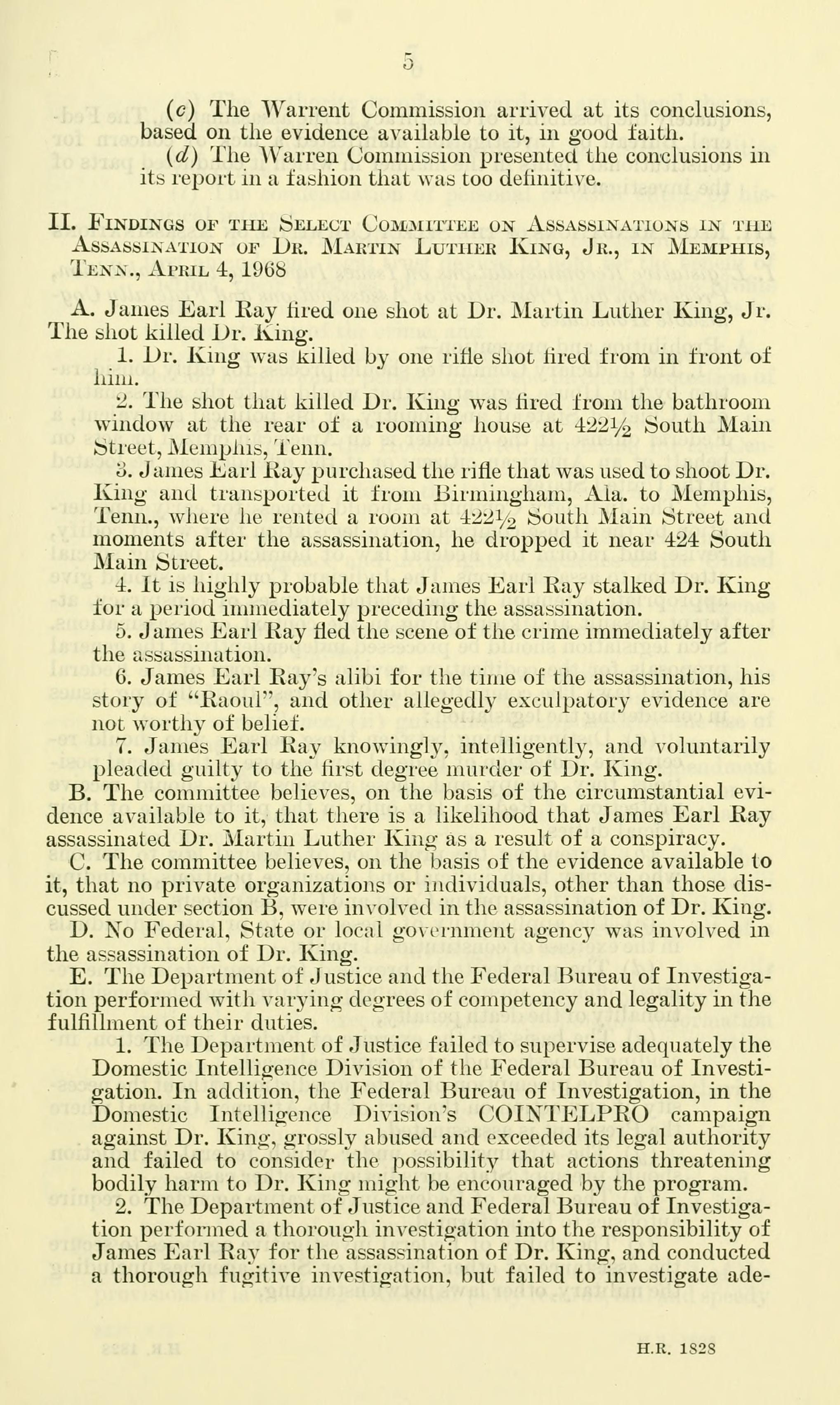
HSCA findings in the assassinations of President Kennedy (left) and Dr. Martin Luther King, Jr. (right), as published in 1979.

=== General conclusions ===
In particular, the various investigations performed by the U.S. government were faulted for insufficient consideration of the possibility of a conspiracy in each case. The committee in its report also made recommendations for legislative and administrative improvements, including making some assassinations Federal crimes.

=== Conclusions regarding the King assassination ===
On the King assassination, the committee concluded in its report that while King was killed by one rifle shot from James Earl Ray, "there is a likelihood" that it was the result of a conspiracy, and that no U.S. government agency was part of this conspiracy; on the contrary, it was more likely to be between Ray and his brothers.

=== Conclusions regarding the Kennedy assassination ===
On the Kennedy assassination, the HSCA concluded in its 1979 report that:

1. Lee Harvey Oswald fired three shots at Kennedy. The second and third shots Oswald fired struck the President. The third shot he fired killed the President.
2. Scientific acoustical evidence establishes a high probability that at least two gunmen fired at the President. Other scientific evidence does not preclude the possibility of two gunmen firing at the President. Scientific evidence negates some specific conspiracy allegations.
3. The committee believes, on the basis of the evidence available to it, that Kennedy was probably assassinated as a result of a conspiracy. The committee was unable to identify the other gunmen or the extent of the conspiracy.
  - The committee believes, on the basis of the evidence available to it, that the Soviet Government was not involved in the assassination of Kennedy.
  - The committee believes, on the basis of the evidence available to it, that the Cuban Government was not involved in the assassination of Kennedy.
  - The committee believes, on the basis of the evidence available to it, that anti-Castro Cuban groups, as groups, were not involved in the assassination of Kennedy, but that the available evidence does not preclude the possibility that individual members may have been involved.
  - The committee believes, on the basis of the evidence available to it, that the national syndicate of organized crime, as a group, was not involved in the assassination of Kennedy, but that the available evidence does not preclude the possibility that individual members may have been involved.
  - The Secret Service, Federal Bureau of Investigation, and Central Intelligence Agency were not involved in the assassination of Kennedy.
4. Agencies and departments of the U.S. Government performed with varying degrees of competency in the fulfillment of their duties. President Kennedy did not receive adequate protection. A thorough and reliable investigation into the responsibility of Lee Harvey Oswald for the assassination was conducted. The investigation into the possibility of conspiracy in the assassination was inadequate. The conclusions of the investigations were arrived at in good faith, but presented in a fashion that was too definitive.

The committee further concluded that it was probable that:

- four shots were fired
- the fourth shot came from a second assassin located on the grassy knoll, but missed. The HSCA concluded the existence and location of this alleged fourth shot based on the Dallas Police Department Dictabelt recording analysis, along with witness testimony that reported suspicious activity in the vicinity.^{:91}

The HSCA agreed with the single bullet theory, but concluded that it occurred at a time point during the assassination that differed from any of the several time points the Warren Commission theorized it occurred.

The Department of Justice, FBI, CIA, and the Warren Commission were all criticized for not revealing to the Warren Commission information available in 1964, and the Secret Service was deemed deficient in their protection of the President.

The HSCA made several accusations of deficiency against the FBI and CIA as the Church Committee in 1976. The accusations encompassed organizational failures, miscommunication, and a desire to keep certain parts of their operations secret. Furthermore, the Warren Commission expected these agencies to be forthcoming with any information that would aid their investigation. But the FBI and CIA only saw it as their duty to respond to specific requests for information from the commission. However, the HSCA found the FBI and CIA were deficient in performing even that limited role.

== Criticisms ==
Although the HSCA publicly released its findings in 12 volumes and a single-volume summary report, the majority of primary documents were sealed for 50 years under congressional rules. In 1992, Congress passed legislation to collect and open up all the evidence relating to Kennedy's death, and created the Assassination Records Review Board (ARRB) to further that goal. The ARRB reported: "Because the HSCA investigation was marked by internal squabbling and disillusioned staffers, the committee's records were the subject of ongoing controversy. Some ex-staffers claimed the HSCA report did not reflect their investigative work, and that information that did not conform with the committee leadership's preconceived conclusions was ignored or left out of the report and supporting volumes."

In 1992, author Bonar Menninger dismissed the committee report as Blakey's $5 Million Folly.

Robert Blakey, the chief counsel of the committee, later changed his views that the CIA was being cooperative and forthcoming with the investigation when he learned that the CIA's special liaison to the committee researchers, George Joannides, was actually involved with some of the organizations that Lee Harvey Oswald was allegedly involved with in the months leading up to the assassination. Among these organizations was an anti-Castro group, the Directorio Revolucionario Estudiantil, which was linked to the CIA (Joannides was in fact working for the CIA in 1963). Chief Counsel Blakey later stated that Joannides should have in fact been interviewed by the HCSA, rather than serving as a gatekeeper to the CIA's evidence and files regarding the assassination. He further disregarded and suspected all the CIA's statements and representations to the committee, accusing it of obstruction of justice.

In the same 2003 interview, Blakey issued a statement on the Central Intelligence Agency:

...I no longer believe that we were able to conduct an appropriate investigation of the [Central Intelligence] Agency and its relationship to Oswald.... We now know that the Agency withheld from the Warren Commission the CIA–Mafia plots to kill Castro. Had the commission known of the plots, it would have followed a different path in its investigation. The Agency unilaterally deprived the commission of a chance to obtain the full truth, which will now never be known. Significantly, the Warren Commission's conclusion that the agencies of the government co-operated with it is, in retrospect, not the truth. We also now know that the Agency set up a process that could only have been designed to frustrate the ability of the committee in 1976–79 to obtain any information that might adversely affect the Agency. Many have told me that the culture of the Agency is one of prevarication and dissimulation and that you cannot trust it or its people. Period. End of story. I am now in that camp.

According to Dan Hardway, an investigator for the HCSA, Joannides was running a "covert operation" to obstruct their investigation into the assassination. Hardway says that when Joannides was brought in by the CIA, he limited their access to files and changed the process for file requests. Another HSCA investigator, Gaeton Fonzi, said of Joannides that "instead of facilitating document requests he was more and more dancing around, delaying and blocking them".
