= Igor Lopatonok =

Ukrainian film director

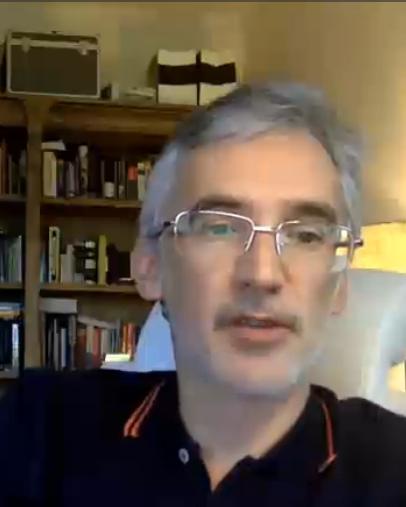

Igor Lopatonok (born 4 January 1968, Marganets, Ukrainian SSR, USSR) is a film producer, holding US and Russian passports. He is known for his work in colorization and 3D conversion and as a documentary filmmaker.

== Biography ==
Lopatonok began to study engineering at the Dnipropetrovsk National University at age 16. Later he finished at Moscow State Institute of International Relations studies in International Finance and worked for a few years in this area. In 2005 he began his career as a producer in the film business, by co-founding the production company Technomedia which specialised in offering new digital technologies to Ukrainian film professionals. One example of work was the colorization of Only "Old Men" Are Going Into Battle, a Soviet war drama from the 1970s filmed in black and white.

He was responsible for the 3D effects in The Nutcracker in 3D.

His production company is Global 3 Pictures. With Oliver Stone as executive producer, he directed the controversial documentary Ukraine on Fire about the Maidan Uprising during the winter months of 2013/14.

His 2019 documentary film, Revealing Ukraine, produced by Stone, featured interviews with Vladimir Putin.

In 2021, his film, Qazaq: History of the Golden Man, was released as both a feature film and an eight-hour miniseries, produced by Stone, who featured in it interviewing Kazakhstan’s authoritarian former ruler, Nursultan Nazarbayev. The film received at least $5 million funding from Nazarbayev's own charitable foundation, Elbasy, via the country's State Center for Support of National Cinema, according to the Organized Crime and Corruption Reporting Project. Stone and Lopatonok had denied any Kazakhstani government involvement.

In 2022, it was reported that Lopatonok was making a film about the Russian invasion of Ukraine.

In 2024, Lopatonok made a six-part film series entitled All the President's Men: The Conspiracy Against Trump in which he paid Kash Patel $25,000 to appear. The series ran on the Tucker Carlson media platform in November 2024.

== Private life ==
From 1992 until 2009 he was married to Marina Lopatonok. His second marriage (2009-2017) was with Nina Podolska.

In 2008 he moved to the Los Angeles area where he resides since.

== Filmography ==
(as director)

- All the President's Men: The Conspiracy Against Trump (2024)
- Qazaq: History of the Golden Man (2021)
- The Everlasting Present - Ukraine: 30 Years of Independence (2021)
- Revealing Ukraine (2019)
- Ukraine on Fire (2016)
