= Ukraine on Fire (film) =

- Film poster
- Directed by: Igor Lopatonok
- Written by: Vanessa Dean
- Produced by: Igor Lopatonok
- Starring: Oliver Stone; Vladimir Putin; Victor Yanukovich; Vitaly Zakharchenko; Robert Parry
- Narrated by: Lex Lang
- Production company: Another Way Productions
- Distributed by: Another Way Productions; Cinema Libre Studio
- Release dates: June 2016 (Taormina Film Fest); July 18, 2017
- Running time: 95 minutes
- Country: United States
- Language: English

Ukraine on Fire is a propaganda documentary film directed by Igor Lopatonok and premiered at the 2016 Taormina Film Fest. It features Oliver Stone, the executive producer, interviewing pro-Russian figures surrounding the Revolution of Dignity such as Viktor Yanukovych and Vladimir Putin. The film portrays a Kremlin-friendly version of the events that led to the flight of Yanukovych in February 2014 as a coup d'état orchestrated by the United States with the help of far-right Ukrainian factions.

== Synopsis ==
The film's central thesis is that the U.S. had used Ukraine as a proxy against Russia for many years. It also claims that a large and influential section of Ukrainian protestors involved in the 2014 Revolution of Dignity were neo-Nazis.

The film starts by recounting historical themes such as the Cossack Hetmanate, World War I and the Treaty of Brest-Litovsk, the annexation of Western Ukraine by the USSR, the Great Patriotic War, Ukrainian collaborationism in World War II, the massacre of Jews at Babyn Yar, the Volyn massacre of Poles and the guerilla war of the Ukrainian Insurgent Army against the Soviets up to the mid 1950s.

The film says that during the Cold War, the CIA maintained contact with Ukrainian nationalists in order to have possible channels for counterintelligence towards the USSR, mentioning Ukrainian nationalist leaders including Mykola Lebed, Stepan Bandera, Dmytro Dontsov, Andriy Melnyk and Roman Shukhevych.

It then maintains that the free market economy which was introduced after the collapse of the Soviet Union in the "crazy 1990s", gave rise to a small class of oligarchs who acquired vast wealth and power, while leaving the majority of the population in poverty.

A big part of the film is dedicated to far-right politics in Ukraine, including the organizations Svoboda, Tryzub and Right Sector.

The film mentions the Orange Revolution in which Ukrainians rejected a fraudulent presidential election, and then portrays some aspects of the Maidan protests, including the negotiations over a trade agreement with the European Union, the role of NGOs, and the appearance of US politicians such as Chris Murphy and John McCain. The film states that the Maidan protests, initially peaceful, began to escalate with the involvement of radical elements, including Right Sector activists who were purportedly brought to the Maidan to "muscle" the peaceful demonstrations.

After that, the film presents Oliver Stone's interviews with Viktor Yanukovych and Vladimir Putin, in which they expound their view of the situation in 2013 regarding the trade agreement and why negotiations were paused. The film also covers selected aspects of the events leading to Yanukovych's removal from office by the Verkhovna Rada, Ukraine's parliament, claiming that the impeachment against him was unconstitutional.

Finally, the film presents events of the following months, including the invasion and annexation of Crimea by Russia, the war in eastern Ukraine, and the downing of the airliner MH17 by a Russian missile. The film criticizes NATO's eastward expansion and the imposition of sanctions against Russia. It questions the legitimacy of the post-Yanukovych government in Kyiv.

The film concludes by presenting the concept of the Doomsday Clock, which indicated a high level of global risk in 2015 due to the modernization of nuclear arsenals.

== Release ==
The film premiered at the Taormina Film Festival in Italy on 16 June 2016; thereafter, it did not receive a general theatrical release but was published as DVD on 18 July 2017. Later, the documentary became also available in the video on demand market via Apple TV and Amazon Prime and since June 2021 also on YouTube. It was aired in Russia on national television network REN TV in November 2016.

In March 2022, it was reported that the film had been removed from YouTube and Vimeo. YouTube explained they "removed this video for violating our violent or graphic content policy, which prohibits content containing footage of corpses with massive injuries, such as severed limbs"; subsequently, the film was uploaded to Rumble for free viewing. As of 12 March 2022, the film was again available on YouTube, this time with a content warning attached.

== Controversy ==
The film was regarded as presenting "a Kremlin-friendly version of the events". It was criticized for its historically inaccurate claim that "Ukraine has never been a united country" and for advancing the Russian narrative about the Revolution of Dignity.

According to the Organized Crime and Corruption Reporting Project, "“Ukraine on Fire was derided for advancing the Russian narrative about Ukraine’s 2014 Euromaidan revolution, portraying it as a nationalist coup orchestrated by the United States".

== Reception ==
Andrew Roth, writing from Moscow for The Guardian, said that Ukraine on Fire is part of "a series of documentary projects featuring Stone about Russia and Ukraine that reflect a strongly pro-Kremlin worldview", remarking further that "Stone has noted that the films, which are strongly critical of the 2014 Maidan revolution and have been attacked as propaganda vehicles, are very popular in Russia." Stephen Velychenko, the University of Toronto's Chair of Ukrainian Studies, described the movie as "cheap propaganda". Velychenko criticized what he viewed as Stone's pro-Russian bias and the portrayal of Maidan events as a product of CIA machinations. He said that focusing on the involvement of foreign intelligence services in the great events in world history leads to apologetics or conspiracy theories.

Writing in Collectible Dry, Antonio Armano said that, compared to the Academy Award-nominated Winter on Fire, a documentary released a year earlier that portrayed the Euromaidan revolution positively, Ukraine on Fire is a journalistic product, "less narrative and emotional". He wrote that while the film attempts to explain Ukraine's complex, far-reaching past, he criticized the film for failing to mention the Holodomor, Stalin's collectivization of land and persecution of religion. He argued that leaving those events out of the reconstruction of Ukraine's history makes it hard to understand why the Nazis were welcomed as liberators. Armano says that the movie's ultimate message, to beware Cold War 2.0 and a nuclear confrontation between the United States and Russia, is impossible not to agree with.

James Kirchick of The Daily Beast called the film a "dictator suckup", writing that "Yanukovych ceased being president on 22 February 2014 because he fled Kiev, rendering himself incapable of performing his presidential duties under the Ukrainian constitution. Over three-quarters of the country’s parliament, including many members of Yanukovych’s own party, voted effectively to impeach him that day", and "It is astoundingly patronizing for Stone to lecture Ukrainians—thousands of whom have fought and died defending their dismembered country from an all-out invasion by their much more powerful neighbor—about what they do and do not know about Viktor Yanukovych, Russia and the potential for a new Cold War".

Rod Dreher, a writer for the American Conservative, said: "I expected 'Ukraine On Fire' to be propaganda, and indeed it was. But that doesn't mean it is entirely a lie, and in any case, it's important to know how the other side regards a conflict, if only to understand how they are likely thinking." Pavel Shekhtman, a Russian dissident, writing for the Kharkiv Human Rights Protection Group, called the documentary "undistilled Kremlin propaganda", arguing that among the main Ukrainian political figures described as neo-Nazis by Stone, only Oleh Tyahnybok resorted to xenophobia and antisemitic rhetoric.

Pekka Kallioniemi of Vatnik Soup denounced the film as Russian propaganda in 2023, criticizing it for depicting Eastern Ukraine and Crimea as "pro-Russian", despite all Ukrainian Oblasts voting for independence in the 1991 referendum.

== See also ==
- Winter on Fire: Ukraine's Fight for Freedom
- 93: Battle for Ukraine
