= Day of Dignity and Freedom =

Holiday in Ukraine

Day of Dignity and Freedom День гідності та свободи
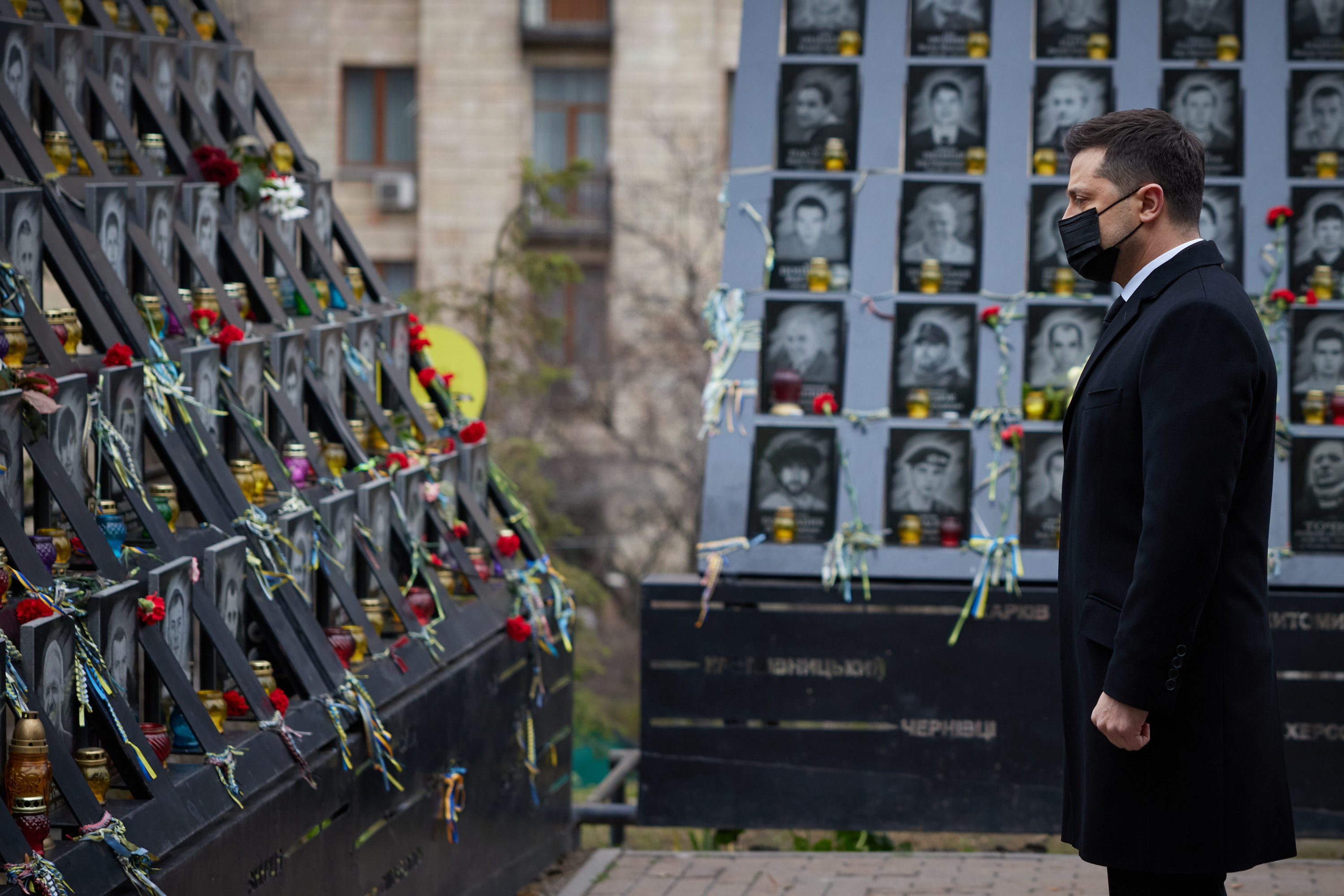
- Ukraine's president Volodymyr Zelenskyy pays tribute to the fallen Revolution of Dignity activists on the Day of Dignity and Freedom in 2021
- Observed by: Ukraine
- Date: November 21
- Frequency: annual
- First time: 2014
- Related to: Orange Revolution and the Revolution of Dignity

The Day of Dignity and Freedom (Ukrainian: День гідності та свободи, romanized: Den hidnosti ta svobody) is an annual designated day in Ukraine observed annually on November 21. It commemorates the beginning of the Orange Revolution in 2004 and the Revolution of Dignity (Euromaidan) in 2013, the two large pro-democracy revolutions in the history of independent Ukraine.

The holiday was established in 2014 by president Petro Poroshenko. The presidential decree stated that the purpose of the observance was to affirm the ideals of freedom and democracy in Ukraine and to preserve the memory of "fateful events" in the early 21st century, as well as to honour the patriotism and courage of citizens who defended democratic values, human rights and freedoms, national interests and the country's European choice.

The Day of Dignity and Freedom is considered the successor to Freedom Day (Ukrainian: День Свободи), a holiday introduced in 2005 to mark the anniversary of the Orange Revolution and celebrated on November 22 until it was abolished in 2011 by president Viktor Yanukovych. The Day of Dignity and Freedom is marked across Ukraine by official ceremonies, public gatherings, educational events and religious services.
