= JFK and the Unspeakable =

2008 book by James W. Douglass

JFK and the Unspeakable: Why He Died and Why It Matters
- First edition
- Author: James W. Douglass
- Language: English
- Subject: True crime, John F. Kennedy assassination, Lee Harvey Oswald, United States conspiracies
- Published: 2008, 2010 (Orbis Books hardcover, Touchstone Books paperback)
- Publication place: United States
- Media type: Print (hardcover, paperback)
- Pages: 544 pp
- ISBN: 978-1-57075-755-6
- OCLC: 163707261
- Dewey Decimal: 973.922092

JFK and the Unspeakable: Why He Died and Why It Matters is a book by Catholic Worker theologian and peace activist James W. Douglass that analyzes the presidency of John F. Kennedy, as well as the events surrounding his assassination. The book's central thesis is that Kennedy was a Cold Warrior who turned to peacemaking, and that he was killed by his own security apparatus as a result.

JFK and the Unspeakable was first issued in hardback by Orbis, the publishing arm of Maryknoll, in 2008. The book received an award from the Catholic Press Association and coverage in the religious press. Sales shot up after Oliver Stone went on TV and recommended the book, which then found itself featured in Amazon.com's Top 100 for a week. Touchstone published the paperback edition in 2010.

== Background ==
JFK and the Unspeakable is drawn from many sources, ranging from the Warren Report to works strongly critical of the Warren Report. In his research, Douglass conducted dozens of interviews, synthesized information from the vast assassination literature, and also made use of little-known writings on JFK's presidency and death. The book took Douglass twelve years to write. It was rejected by Orbis three times before it was accepted. Publisher Robert Ellsberg said that besides the daunting 500-page length, the content was "outside the realm of usual subjects for Orbis", and that he was reluctant to enter the "dark thicket" of Kennedy conspiracy theories but that "after sending the book to a wide range of historians and analysts, Mr. Ellsberg was persuaded of the book's significance".

In the book's dedication and acknowledgments, and in an endnote, Douglass expresses his gratitude for the work of early JFK assassination researcher, Vincent Salandria. The book is also dedicated to E. Martin Schotz.

== Contents ==
The title is an allusion to Thomas Merton's 1966 book Raids on the Unspeakable which, according to Douglass, refers to "a kind of systemic evil that defies speech". In a 2013 interview with The Georgia Straight newsletter, Douglass said that Merton's notion of the "Unspeakable" included "such realities as the Holocaust, the Vietnam War, the nuclear arms race, and these assassinations. When he gets to the point where he’s actually describing it, he describes it as a 'void,' an emptiness, a lack of compassion and responsibility, and when I was reading that description, I thought, 'Warren Report.'" As Merton writes in Raids on the Unspeakable, the void "gets into the language of public and official declarations ... and makes them ring dead with the hollowness of the abyss. It is the void out of which Eichmann drew the punctilious exactitude of his obedience."

Douglass links this description of the void to the bleakest hours of the Cuban Missile Crisis, with both Kennedy and Nikita Khrushchev "encounter[ing] that void simultaneously". Citing Khrushchev's memoirs, Douglass tells how Kennedy reached out privately, via his brother, to warn the Soviet Premier that Kennedy was losing power to his generals, who favored nuclear war, and that he needed Khrushchev's help to avoid a dire scenario. Douglass concludes that as a consequence of the harrowing Cuban Missile Crisis, Kennedy "turned from global war to a strategy of peace. That's the why of his assassination."

As compared with other books in the genre, Douglass dwells less on the "how" of the assassination. For instance, the single bullet theory is not mentioned, and he includes no photographs or maps. In his review of the book, James DiEugenio estimates that it's "2/3 about Kennedy's presidency and 1/3 about his assassination". Only in the long last chapter, "Washington and Dallas", does Douglass chronicle events on November 22. Other than that, he follows the intelligence links around Kennedy, and profiles the key people involved in the post-assassination investigation. He also asks why an apparent Soviet defector like Lee Harvey Oswald was "so tolerated and supported by the government he betrayed".

Douglass spends a good portion of JFK and the Unspeakable recounting how Kennedy ended up in conflict with powerful forces in the intelligence, military, and corporate worlds. The book begins by examining the Bay of Pigs Invasion as the CIA's attempt to entrap the new president into a full-scale U.S. military assault on Cuba. Quoting Daniel Schorr's conclusion that "[i]n effect, President Kennedy was the target of a CIA covert operation that collapsed when the invasion collapsed", Douglass observes how in the aftermath of the failed operation, Kennedy threatened "to splinter the CIA in a thousand pieces and scatter it to the winds". The forced resignation of CIA Director Allen Dulles, along with several of his deputies, served notice that this threat might be followed through. The book also revisits Kennedy's clashes with his military advisers, including over the Cuban Missile Crisis (1962), the Partial Nuclear Test Ban Treaty (ratified by the Senate in September 1963), his back-channel to Fidel Castro in 1963 via William Attwood in an effort to normalize U.S.-Cuba relations, and his National Security Action Memorandum 263 (initiating withdrawal from Vietnam).

Douglass cites Kennedy's April 1962 confrontation with the domestic steel industry, led by U.S. Steel, which together with five other steel companies announced a price increase shortly after an agreement had been brokered with the Kennedy administration to hold steel prices flat to control inflation. In retaliation, the Kennedy administration raided corporate offices, issued subpoenas, and tasked the Defense Department with overseas marketing of its steel. After the steel industry finally backed down, Henry Luce's Fortune published an editorial headlined, "Steel: The Ides of April", stating that the price increase had been conceived in political terms as a means to either damage the President's credibility or to unite the business world against him.

One of the techniques Douglass employs is to interleave multiple stories to provide a "textured effect". For example, in his "Saigon and Chicago" chapter, he "cinematically" cuts between two concurrent sequences of events leading up to and culminating on the weekend of November 2, 1963: (1) the coup in Saigon that killed South Vietnamese President Ngô Đình Diệm and his brother Ngô Đình Nhu, and (2) a Chicago-based assassination plot against Kennedy that bore a striking resemblance to what transpired in Dallas three weeks later and was only thwarted at the last minute when the White House cancelled the President’s Chicago visit due to security concerns.

Douglass singles out Kennedy's June 1963 commencement address at American University as both the high point of his presidency and an act that sealed his fate. He writes:

[T]he American University address was a profile in courage with lethal consequences. President Kennedy's June 10, 1963, call for an end to the Cold War, five and one-half months before his assassination, anticipates Dr. King's courage in his April 4, 1967, Riverside Church address calling for an end to the Vietnam War, exactly one year before his assassination. Each of those transforming speeches was a prophetic statement provoking the reward a prophet traditionally receives.

== Critical and commercial reception ==
Promotional reviews of Douglass's book were provided by Richard A. Falk, Gaeton Fonzi, and Daniel Ellsberg. JFK's nephew Robert F. Kennedy Jr. wrote a blurb saying the book had moved him to visit Dealey Plaza for the first time. The book was well-received by researchers of JFK assassination conspiracy theories, with The Georgia Straight describing it in 2013 as "achiev[ing] a rare consensus inside the assassination research community for its wise and lucid organization of the known data." In 2009, Oliver Stone labeled it "an extraordinary new book [which] offers the best account I have read of this tragedy and its significance." He also gave the book a valuable bit of publicity during an appearance on Real Time with Bill Maher, which led to a sharp increase in sales. In a review in Human Rights Quarterly, David Lempert called Douglass's book "a gem". In 2011, James DiEugenio praised JFK and the Unspeakable as "a well organized, thoroughly documented, and felicitously composed piece of workmanship that is both comprehensible and easy to read." In 2013, David Talbot included it in his list of the seven best books on the JFK assassination.

Several religious publications praised JFK and the Unspeakable. Ched Myers in Tikkun recommended it to his readers, saying the book "could not matter more". The Jesuit magazine America called it "a compelling book, a thoroughly researched account of Kennedy’s turn toward peace, the consequent assassination and its aftermath". Tom Roberts of National Catholic Reporter wrote in his review that Douglass postulates two theses at variance with conventional wisdom:

The first is that John F. Kennedy, that quintessential cold warrior who seemingly couldn't wait to invade Cuba, who went to the brink of nuclear annihilation over missiles in our hemisphere and who rolled tanks to the Berlin Wall to face off with communist tanks on the other side, was actually undergoing a deep conversion to peacemaker during his brief tenure as president. The second is that that conversion -- documented by Mr. Douglass from secret communications between Kennedy and his archrival Soviet Premier Nikita Khrushchev; between Kennedy and Cuba's Fidel Castro; from memos and executive orders, some released as a result of a federal law enacted in 1992 -- so angered the U.S. intelligence and military communities that they got rid of him.

Publishers Weekly said in 2012 that the book was "now recommended reading for those seriously investigating political assassinations." The New York Observer said of the book that it included "a selective rehashing of such conspiracy chestnuts as the Ike Altgens photo, which allegedly shows Oswald standing in the doorway of the Texas Book Depository at the exact moment he should have been firing away on the sixth floor. The book's real interest lies in its portrait of J.F.K. ... [and] does make a convincing case that J.F.K. was becoming deeply disillusioned with the bellicosity of American foreign policy and the inordinate power of the military–industrial complex. Whether this got him killed remains, like just about everything else that happened in Dallas, the stuff of myth."

In the Washington Decoded newsletter, John C. McAdams harshly reviewed the book, declaring: "As bad as Douglass's account of Kennedy's foreign policy is, his depiction of a plot to murder JFK is worse—unspeakably bad, in fact. To paraphrase Thomas Merton, Douglass's muse and inspiration, the bunk and nonsense Douglass recycles goes beyond the capacity of words to describe. He is utterly uncritical of any theory, any witness, and any factoid, as long as it implies conspiracy."

== Editions ==
- JFK and the Unspeakable: Why He Died and Why It Matters, Orbis Books, 2008. ISBN 978-1-57075-755-6. Hardback, 544 pp.
- JFK and the Unspeakable: Why He Died and Why It Matters, Touchstone Books, October 2010. ISBN 978-1-43919-388-4. Paperback, 560 pp.

Seth Jacobson and Oliver Hine were given permission by Douglass to create a graphic novel version, which they posted on Kickstarter. A play based on the book, called Noah's Ark, was staged in November 2013 in Birmingham, Alabama.

== See also ==
- Abraham Bolden
- Edwin Black
