= Attempted assassination of John F. Kennedy =

Attempted assassination of John F. Kennedy may refer to:

- Chicago plot, the alleged 1963 attempt
- Assassination of John F. Kennedy, the successful 1963 attempt

== See also ==
- List of United States presidential assassination attempts and plots
