= Abraham Bolden =

American Secret Service agent (born 1935)

Abraham W. Bolden (born January 19, 1935) is a former United States Secret Service agent. He was the first African American assigned to the presidential security detail, appointed in 1961 by John F. Kennedy. In 1964, Bolden was fired from the Secret Service after he was charged with accepting a bribe in relation to a counterfeiting case he had been investigating. Convicted by a jury, he was sentenced to six years in federal prison. Bolden always alleged that he had been framed by members of the government in order to intimidate and silence him. He was pardoned by President Joe Biden in April 2022.

== Early life ==
Bolden was born January 19, 1935 to Daniel and Ophelia Bolden in East St. Louis, Illinois. He attended Lincoln High School in East St. Louis, Illinois. Bolden graduated cum laude from Lincoln University with a B.A. in music composition. Afterwards, he became the first African-American detective with the Pinkerton National Detective Agency prior to becoming a highway patrolman with the Illinois State Police. Bolden married Barbara L. Hardy in 1956, and the couple had three children: Ahvia Maria, Abraham Jr., and Daaim Shabazz.

== Secret Service career ==
In October 1960, Bolden became a member of the United States Secret Service. In June 1961, he was transferred from the Chicago office and given a 30-day temporary assignment in the Presidential Protective Division guarding John F. Kennedy. As a result of this assignment, Bolden had the distinction of being the first African American to guard a U.S. president. According to Michael Torina who was then chief inspector of the Secret Service, Bolden's assignment was routine and "we aren't making anything of it or providing any biographical matter, as is the same for any other agent." Torina added that it was a standard Secret Service practice to rotate newer agents onto the White House detail within the first two years of their service.

Bolden's recollection of the circumstances of his White House assignment was slightly different. He said it occurred after he met Kennedy on April 28, 1961 while working an event at the McCormick Place in Chicago. According to Bolden, Kennedy personally invited him to join the White House detail as the first African American to protect the President. Bolden also said that Kennedy once introduced him to others as "the Jackie Robinson of the Secret Service", a comment Bolden found so touching he almost broke into tears. Bolden soon grew disenchanted by his experiences in the Presidential Protective Division. He voluntarily left it after his probationary period ended in July 1961. He later said his decision to leave was a "protest against the poor security being given the president." Bolden returned to Chicago as a field agent in the counterfeiting division where he built a record of success. He "won two commendations for cracking counterfeiting rings". Jet magazine reported that in 1962, he "ranked second in the nation in solving" counterfeit and check forging cases.

== Bribery charges ==
On May 12, 1964, Bolden was accused of attempting to sell a government file to Joseph Spagnoli Jr. in exchange for $50,000. The file was evidence for a case in which Spagnoli was named as the head of a counterfeiting ring. Bolden was arraigned in Chicago on May 20, 1964, on federal charges that he had solicited a bribe from the ring that he had helped break. A federal grand jury returned a three-count indictment against Bolden, charging him with "seeking a bribe in violation of his official duty" (18 U.S.C. § 201), "corruptly obstructing the due administration of justice" (18 U.S.C. § 1503), and "conspiring with Frank Jones to commit the crimes defined in these sections" (18 U.S.C. § 371).

=== Allegations: framed for attempting to reveal Secret Service misconduct ===
On May 20, 1964, Bolden held a news conference at his home on the South Side of Chicago and denied the charges. He asserted that he had been framed by the government because he intended to tell the Warren Commission about a pattern of misconduct on the part of agents assigned to protect Kennedy. Bolden stated that two weeks earlier, prior to leaving for Washington, D.C. to attend an in-service training, he mentioned to a fellow agent that he would try to testify before the Warren Commission. He told the media: "I wanted to, and I still intend to, tell the commission about the laxity and nonchalant attitude of secret service agents handling the protection of the President." Bolden charged that agents drank heavily before and after assignments guarding Kennedy in Washington and at his summer home in Hyannis Port, Massachusetts, that they missed their work shifts or reported to them "half drunk", and that they used official Secret Service cars to transport female companions or to visit bars. He said another agent called him a racial epithet when he complained about these issues. Bolden also stated that he told James J. Rowley, head of the Secret Service, about the drinking but that no action was taken.

Edward Hanrahan, the then United States Attorney for the Northern District of Illinois, issued a statement describing Bolden's allegations as "fantastic" and said, "The accuracy of these charges should be judged by the fact that the man who made them was silent from 1961 until after he was arrested..." Newspaper reports indicated that the Warren Commission was made aware of the allegations and quoted an unnamed member of the Commission: "It would appear that he is trying to get off the hook by making such charges now. Nevertheless, the charges he makes are serious. He desires to testify and his request ought to be approved." According to the Associated Press, a Commission spokesman said they were considering calling Bolden but had made no decision.

On June 18, Rowley addressed Bolden's allegations in testimony before the Warren Commission. Rowley explained that Bolden was selected to rotate through the White House detail for 30 days in the summer of 1961 as part of an orientation program, and that the allegations referred to a five-day span in Hyannis Port. When J. Lee Rankin, Warren Commission general counsel, asked Rowley when he heard about Bolden's charges of misconduct, Rowley replied: "The fact is he never informed me. He never informed any of his supervisors or anyone on the detail." Rankin then interrupted the questioning to state: "I think the record should show, Mr. Chairman, that we were never advised that he [Bolden] wanted to testify, nor had we any inquiry or anything about the matter, until after we learned about it in the newspapers. And, even then, he didn't ask to testify. And we asked the FBI to check into it, and he had counsel and they refused to tell anything about the matter at that time." Rowley later stated there was "no truth to the charges of misconduct". He added that Bolden had leveled eleven charges and there was partial truth to only one of them (i.e., agents had purchased 2-3 cases of beer while grocery shopping for the house where the Secret Service men were staying), but that Rowley's internal investigation found there were no violations of Secret Service regulations. In response to Rankin's questioning, Rowley answered that as far as he knew, Bolden's indictment in May was the first time a criminal complaint had been lodged against a Secret Service agent. Bolden himself was never called before the Warren Commission.

=== Trials ===
On July 6, 1964, Bolden's trial opened in the United States District Court for the Northern District of Illinois before Judge Joseph Samuel Perry. To raise money for his legal defense, Bolden had performed a series of piano recitals throughout Chicago in which he played his own compositions. The government's case relied on the testimony of two men, Frank Jones and Joseph Spagnoli Jr., both under indictment in Chicago for counterfeiting U.S. bonds. The main allegation against Bolden was that he used Jones as a go-between in an illegal moneymaking operation. Jones said that Bolden had shown him several documents stapled together and a small, typewritten piece of paper containing an excerpt from the Spagnoli investigation report. Bolden purportedly directed Jones to visit Spagnoli, show him the piece of paper, and offer to sell Spagnoli his entire file for $50,000 (according to Jones, Bolden told him they would split the money). Jones was to assure Spagnoli that he had a Secret Service contact with access to the file.

Maurice Martineau, Secret Service agent in charge of the Chicago office, was the first witness for the prosecution. He testified that Spagnoli had complained to him in a telephone call that the government was attempting to entrap him. Martineau added that his own investigation led him to Jones, who informed him of the illegal operation being orchestrated by Bolden. Martineau said he confronted Bolden with the allegations, and that Bolden denied them.

The following day on July 7, Jones—the prosecution's chief witness—testified that Bolden had attempted to sell government information for $50,000. He said Bolden had driven him to a park where he showed him parts of a Secret Service file. In his testimony on July 9, Bolden denied all the charges. He also denied he had offered Richard Walter, an informant, $500 to kill Jones, and said he only warned Walter to stay away from Jones. Twice during deliberations, the jury reached an impasse. After the first occurrence, Judge Perry issued an Allen charge in which he told the jury that the evidence sustained a guilty verdict, but that the jury was free to disregard his opinion. Nevertheless, the jury remained deadlocked at 11-1 (in favor of conviction), and Perry declared a mistrial on July 11, 1964. He set August 3 as the date for a new trial.

On August 12, 1964, the jury in the second trial found Bolden guilty of the charges and Judge Perry sentenced him to six years in prison. Perry had the option to sentence him to 25 years and $165,000 ($15,000 plus three times the amount of the bribe). Bolden was reported to have responded tearfully to the verdict and to have apologized by saying that "if at the time of my arrest I ever embarrassed any agency of the United States it was because I thought at the time my statements were true." Acknowledging Bolden's apology, Hanrahan told the media: "The verdict completely rejects the outrageous charges made by the defendant and confirms the public's belief in the absolute integrity of the U.S. Secret Service." Bolden filed a notice of appeal. In that same month of August, he was fired by the Secret Service. While his appeal was pending, Bolden was employed in Chicago by the Ingersoll Products Division of the Borg-Warner Corporation as an assembly line inspector of government ordered helmets and canteens. At Ingersoll, he was credited with starting a collection among fellow employees that raised enough money to send 75,000 cigarettes to American military forces in South Vietnam. During that time, he was also an official for Local 333 of the United Automobile Workers.

=== Appeal and presidential pardon ===
In January 1965, five months after Bolden's trial and sentencing, Spagnoli was found guilty on counterfeiting charges and sentenced to fifteen years. At his trial, Spagnoli said his livelihood was gambling, that he had falsely testified in Bolden's trial about his mother being his primary source of income, and that his false testimony was suborned by the government counsel in order to improve the jury's opinion of him. Spagnoli also said he lied about the date of his first contact with Agent Martineau and may have lied about other dates. On the basis of this information, Bolden appealed his conviction as well as the denial of a motion for a retrial to the United States Court of Appeals for the Seventh Circuit. In addition, he claimed that Perry's use of the "Allen charge" in the first trial was evidence that Perry was not impartial and that his failure to recuse himself denied Bolden a fair trial.

In a decision issued December 29, 1965, Judges John Simpson Hastings, Winfred George Knoch, and Luther Merritt Swygert for the Seventh Circuit Court upheld Bolden's conviction and denied a retrial. The Court wrote that they found no merit to his claim that he had not received an impartial trial under Perry, and that his opinion to the deliberating jurors as to what the evidence showed could not be equated with personal bias. Regarding Spagnoli's testimony at Bolden's trial, the Court said his testimony was "merely cumulative" and rejected Bolden's "central contention" that Spagnoli was an essential witness for the prosecution whose testimony could only be corroborated by the testimony of Jones. Addressing the issue of perjury that was at the core of Bolden's appeal, the Seventh Circuit Court noted what Spagnoli had testified at both trials, and said he had not actually perjured himself about his source of income. The Court noted that Spagnoli's "livelihood was clearly a collateral matter bearing upon his credibility" and that they did not believe "the jury's overall appraisal of this witness would have been substantially affected by the knowledge that he was being less than forthright concerning his source of income."

Bolden was ordered to begin serving his sentence in June 1966. He served thirty-nine months in prison and was released on two and a half years' probation. On April 26, 2022, it was announced that Bolden had been pardoned by President Joe Biden as part of "Second Chance Month".

== Allegations of a "Chicago plot" to assassinate John F. Kennedy ==
=== Early reports ===
On December 5, 1967, while Bolden was serving his sentence at the United States Medical Center for Federal Prisoners in Springfield, Missouri, he was visited by attorneys John Hosmer (Bolden's lawyer), Mark Lane (author of Rush to Judgment), and Richard V. Burnes (assistant to New Orleans District Attorney Jim Garrison). After the visit, the attorneys held a news conference in which they stated they had just learned from Bolden that three weeks prior to the assassination in Dallas, the Secret Service was aware of, and worked to thwart, a Chicago-based assassination plot against Kennedy. In a June 1971 article published in Computers and Automation, Bernard Fensterwald wrote: "As a result of this visit, Bolden's 'story' was given world-wide circulation; yet, instead of this resulting in his case getting a new hearing, he was put into solitary confinement." Fensterwald suggested that the refusal to let Bolden testify to the Warren Commission was not simply done to silence his complaints about laxity and drunkenness among Kennedy's Secret Service detail, it was to avoid giving Bolden an opportunity to speak about the Chicago plot:

After the appointment of the Warren Commission, Bolden expressed a desire to testify if no one else from the Secret Service was going to tell of the plot investigated in Chicago in late October. He felt that this testimony was not only relevant but also essential to the work of the Commission. He also wished to tell the Commission of the laxity he had observed in the Service, especially with regard to the White House detail. When his request for permission to testify was turned down by his superiors, and when he was told that no one from the Secret Service was to so testify about the Chicago plot, Bolden discussed the matter at length with his fellow Negro agent, Conrad Cross. Then when Bolden went to Washington for the Secret Service School on May 17th, he was accompanied by a "baby sitter", agent McLeod, who overheard his attempted call to Commission Counsel Rankin. This was the beginning of the end for Bolden. He was hustled out of Washington the next morning on the pretext that he was needed in Chicago.

Due to Fensterwald's article and a subsequent in-depth account by journalist Edwin Black in the November 1975 issue of Chicago Independent magazine, more of the Chicago plot became known. According to Bolden, the Chicago Secret Service office had received word from the FBI on Wednesday, October 30, 1963 that an attempt on the President's life would be made on Saturday, November 2. It would occur when Kennedy traveled in a motorcade from O'Hare Airport to Soldier Field to attend the Army-Air Force football game. The Chicago Secret Service convened an emergency meeting, led by Special Agent in Charge Martineau. Bolden was present at the meeting. As James W. Douglass writes based on his 2003 interview with Bolden: "Martineau told the agents the FBI had learned from an informant that four snipers planned to shoot Kennedy with high-powered rifles. Their ambush was set to happen along the route of the presidential motorcade, as it came in from O'Hare down the Northwest Expressway and into the Loop".

The following day, the Secret Service obtained an important tip from the Chicago Police, which originated from the landlady of a Chicago rooming house. She had just rented rooms to four men. "She had seen four rifles with telescopic sights in one of the men's rooms, together with a newspaper sketch of the president's route." Martineau was convinced this was the sniper team, and he set up 24-hour surveillance of the rooming house. His agents were able to apprehend two of the men early Friday morning. Meanwhile, two other agents were following up another lead that "Thomas Arthur Vallee, an alienated ex-Marine, had threatened to kill Kennedy in Chicago." Vallee had recently gotten a job on the third floor of the IPP Litho-Plate warehouse on 625 West Jackson, overlooking where the President's limousine would have to make a slow, left-hand turn en route to the football stadium. Vallee was arrested on Saturday morning. But because two members of the suspected sniper team remained at large, the Chicago Secret Service warned the White House about the still-unresolved security situation. Kennedy's visit was cancelled at the very last moment, with an explanation that the President had contracted a bad cold.

On March 21, 1970, Sherman Skolnick appeared on an FM radio program with Ted Weber of WTMX and stated that Bolden was falsely imprisoned to prevent him from revealing the fact that there had been a plot to kill Kennedy in Chicago. The Chicago Sun-Times reported that they attempted to contact Bolden regarding Skolnick's statement, but Bolden declined to comment. On April 6, 1970, Skolnick filed a lawsuit in Chicago's United States district court accusing the National Archives and Records Service of unlawfully withholding documents about a plot to assassinate Kennedy in Chicago on November 2. The suit went on to say that because the President's visit was cancelled, the assassination was rescheduled for three weeks later in Dallas. Skolnick's key contention was that the Warren Commission had turned over documents to the National Archives, to be held in secret for 75 years, which showed among other things a connection between Thomas Arthur Vallee and Lee Harvey Oswald. The suit demanded all relevant materials be released. In response, the Department of Justice had "No comment" and National Archivist Marion Johnson said he'd seen nothing in the records that connected Vallee to an assassination attempt.

News accounts at the time speculated as to the source supplying information for the lawsuit. For example, Time magazine reported that "a former Secret Service agent" was among those "people with information about the alleged plot" who sought out Skolnick. In a 2006 interview with Kenn Thomas of Steamshovel Press, Skolnick said a "mysterious courier" (someone besides Bolden) had given him a "pile of documents about the Chicago plot". Skolnick claimed the documents had been stolen from the Archives. During the interview, he recalled a clandestine 1970 meeting with Bolden in a parked car outside the latter's Southside Chicago house. According to Skolnick, he had to reassure Bolden that the lawsuit was a good-faith effort to clear Bolden's name and not a government trap designed to revoke his parole and send him back to prison.

In his 1975 Chicago Independent article, Edwin Black described the methods he used to uncover new details about the Chicago plot. He cited his many months tracking down and scrutinizing federal, state, and local documents; plus his dozens of interviews, including with Vallee, Skolnick, and with two named Secret Service agents (other than Bolden) working in the Chicago office in 1963. But Black said his "main source" for the article was a former Secret Service agent whose terms were "total anonymity". Black wrote that this unidentified agent "broke the 'old boy system' of the Secret Service and regulations forbidding press contacts among individual agents."

=== House Select Committee on Assassinations ===
Established in 1976 to investigate the assassinations of President Kennedy and Martin Luther King Jr., the United States House of Representatives Select Committee on Assassinations (HSCA) stated that an essential part of its responsibilities was "[A]n assessment of the performance of agencies such as the CIA, Secret Service, and FBI". The HSCA's final report included the finding that the "Secret Service was deficient in the performance of its duties" as it "possessed information that was not properly analyzed, investigated or used by the Secret Service in connection with the President's trip to Dallas." It said that Secret Service offices in Chicago and Miami failed to relay to the Dallas region two separate threats by individuals, the first by Vallee and the second by Joseph A. Milteer, to assassinate Kennedy with high-powered rifles in early November 1963. On January 19, 1978, Bolden gave testimony to the HSCA. Allegations he made to the committee were discussed in its final report:

In addition [to the threat by Thomas Arthur Vallee], the committee obtained the testimony of a former Secret Service agent, Abraham Bolden, who had been assigned to the Chicago office in 1963. He alleged that shortly before November 2, the FBI sent a teletype message to the Chicago Secret Service office stating that an attempt to assassinate the President would be made on November 2 by a four-man team using high-powered rifles, and that at least one member of the team had a Spanish-sounding name. Bolden claimed that while he did not personally participate in surveillance of the subjects, he learned about a surveillance of the four by monitoring Secret Service radio channels in his automobile and by observing one of the subjects being detained in his Chicago office.

According to Bolden's account, the Secret Service succeeded in locating and surveillance two of the threat subjects who, when they discovered they were being watched, were arrested and detained on the evening of November 1 in the Chicago Secret Service office.

The committee was unable to document the existence of the alleged assassination team. Specifically, no agent who had been assigned to Chicago confirmed any aspect of Bolden's version. One agent did state there had been a threat in Chicago during that period, but he was unable to recall details. Bolden did not link Vallee to the supposed four-man assassination team, although he claimed to remember Vallee's name in connection with a 1963 Chicago case. He did not recognize Vallee's photograph when shown it by the committee.

The questionable authenticity of the Bolden account notwithstanding, the committee believed the Secret Service failed to make appropriate use of the information supplied it by the Chicago threat in early November 1963.

=== Later decades ===
In later decades, Bolden was more willing to talk openly about his time in the Secret Service. He was interviewed for Lamar Waldron and Thom Hartmann's 2005 book Ultimate Sacrifice: John and Robert Kennedy, the Plan for a Coup in Cuba, and the Murder of JFK. Details from his experiences appear throughout the book. In 2006, he was interviewed for the television documentary Conspiracy Files: The JFK Assassination based on information in Ultimate Sacrifice. The documentary asserted that mobster John Roselli was responsible for framing Bolden. Author James W. Douglass interviewed Bolden seven times between 1998 and 2004, and devoted a chapter to the Chicago plot in his book JFK and the Unspeakable: Why He Died and Why It Matters.

These oral histories provided by Bolden, along with his written history in The Echo from Dealey Plaza, became the last remaining links to the events in Chicago because as Douglass writes, "In January 1995, the Secret Service deliberately destroyed all its records of the Chicago plot...when the Assassination Records Review Board requested access to them." In 2007, Bolden reiterated his allegations of the Chicago plot to Chuck Goudie of ABC News Chicago affiliate WLS-TV; ABC News ran the headline describing his claims as a "New Assassination Plot". Bolden was interviewed about the Chicago plot in Episode 5 of the History Channel series Breaking Mysterious, which first aired in 2017.

In 2025 Bolden testified at the second hearing of the House Oversight Committee's "Task Force on the Declassification of Federal Secrets".

== Subsequent career ==
Following his release from prison, Bolden worked as a quality control supervisor in the automotive industry until his retirement in 2001. His wife, Barbara, died in 2005.

=== The Echo From Dealey Plaza ===
In 2008, Bolden published his memoir, The Echo From Dealey Plaza. When interviewed about the book by NPR's Farai Chideya, Bolden said he believed there was a conspiracy to assassinate Kennedy and that he heard Secret Service agents displeased with the President's integration policies comment that they would not attempt to protect him in an assassination attempt. James Douglass reported a similar remark from Bolden during a 2001 interview. Bolden recollected how there were agents who joked "they would step out of the way" if an assassin shot at the President. Reviewing the memoir for The Washington Post, critic Bruce Watson called it "a shocking story of injustice", sometimes marred by "plodding prose and drab dialogue".

== Portrayals in fiction ==
Abraham Bolden appears in the 2011 television miniseries The Kennedys, portrayed by Rothaford Gray. He is depicted joining the President's protective detail. In the "Life Sentences" episode, President Kennedy turns to Bolden as a sounding board during the crisis surrounding the 1962 desegregation of the University of Mississippi. The character Eben Boldt in Target Lancer, a crime fiction novel by Max Allan Collins, is based on Abraham Bolden's role in an assassination attempt against John F. Kennedy in Chicago. Collins acknowledges this basis on Bolden in a postscript to the novel.
