= The Putin Interviews =

2017 television programme

- Genre: Documentary; Biography
- Written by: Oliver Stone (structure)
- Directed by: Oliver Stone
- Starring: Vladimir Putin, Oliver Stone
- Composer: Jeff Beal
- Country of origin: United States
- Original languages: English; Russian with English subtitles
- No. of seasons: 1
- No. of episodes: 4

Production
- Executive producers: Max Arvelaiz; David Tang
- Production locations: Moscow, Russia; Sochi, Russia; Airplane
- Cinematography: Anthony Dod Mantle; Rodrigo Prieto
- Production company: Ixtlan Productions

Original release
- Network: Showtime
- Release: June 12 – June 15, 2017

The Putin Interviews is a four-part, four-hour television series by American filmmaker Oliver Stone, first broadcast in 2017.

The series was created from several interviews with Russian President Vladimir Putin conducted by Stone between 2015 and 2017.

== Summary ==
Stone's interview begins with a biography of Vladimir Putin. Putin explains that he attended Leningrad State University Faculty of Law in the Soviet Union straight out of high school. Next, he was required to take a job with the KGB, the Soviet Union's state security and intelligence agency, in foreign affairs due to the job assignment system in place for college graduates in the Soviet Union. However, he acknowledges that he hoped to get this particular job. Putin then tries to explain many aspects of how things in the former USSR worked.

Putin thinks the West should understand that today's Russia cannot function exactly as the West does. He explains his views on NATO, and cannot see any reason to why this military alliance has grown East after the fall of the Soviet Bloc in Europe. When Stone asks about Putin's views on Edward Snowden and whether he is a traitor or not, Putin replies, "No he is not, as he never has worked for any foreign country," and also claims that Russian intelligence does not know anything more than what Snowden already had leaked before he arrived at Moscow's Sheremetyevo Airport. Stone asks, "What about if an FSB employee had done something similar?", and Putin replies "To spy on one's own allies, really is very dirty." Putin had never seen Stanley Kubrick's 1963 black comedy satire about the Cold War, Dr. Strangelove; the two men watch the film together.

== Reception ==
=== Critical response ===
On Rotten Tomatoes, the documentary series has an approval rating of 75% based on reviews from 12 critics. On Metacritic, it has a weighted average score of 54 out of 100 based on reviews from eight critics, indicating "mixed or average reviews."

Verne Gay of Newsday, who rates the series a B+, acknowledges that "not once does Stone push back, or harsh the mellow with phrases like 'the facts say otherwise'." Gay, however, says that "[d]uring an extraordinary career, Stone has never pretended to be an unbiased journalist – or journalist, period – and he's not about to feign pretense now." Gay claims that Stone never intended to offer the interview series as "balanced" and journalism: "As journalism, this is scattershot at best, but as a conversation that covers a vast span of Russian history, culture, and politics as refracted through the mind of Russia's president – it's often remarkable. Putin has a lot to say. Stone lets him say it. While the many points he makes are impossible to summarize here, Putin's motives for this interview are not: He emerges as an intelligent, sane, reasonable leader caught in the vortex of an occasionally feckless, often contradictory superpower called the United States. Touché." Ken Tucker of Yahoo TV describes Stone's non-combative interview approach as "the flexible way," and counters many critics' desire for hard-hitting critical questions by pointing out that "Putin would not respond well to aggression," and that "one senses Putin would have shut down the interview if anything agitated him too much." Tucker praises Stone's interview style as being effective for this particular subject. Sonia Saraiya of Variety also offers praise of the series, writing that "The Putin Interviews is a destabilizing documentary that challenges Americans' narratives about ourselves and asks the viewer to engage in a conversation with a slippery subject."

A common theme in the documentary's criticism is that in interviewing Vladimir Putin, Oliver Stone refused to challenge Putin with questions on multiple subjects, such as "Russia's anti-LGBT laws or his [Putin's] treatment of political foes." James Poniewozik of The New York Times wrote that despite being "revealing" and offering a "break from the usual news media vantages on Russia, either tough-talk centrism or the defenses of Putin enablers-come-lately in the conservative media," Stone's interviewing is "embarrassingly generous." Poniewozik's charge that the interview is "solicitous, even obsequious" mirrors criticism leveled by Ann Hornaday of The Washington Post, who summarizes the series as consisting mostly of "softball questions," and by Brian Lowry of CNN who writes that "Stone's idle chitchat and solicitous tone will surely leave many journalists and Putin critics gnashing their teeth." Marlow Stern of The Daily Beast stated that the interview series intentionally set out to "humanize Putin and demonize America," and similarly concludes that "Stone not only fails to challenge Putin, but essentially cedes him the floor."

== Controversy ==
=== Putin's video ===
During a scene in Stone's interview series with Putin, the president took out his phone to show Stone a clip of how "our aviation" was firing at militants in Syria. "That's how our forces are operating," Putin told the director. "These militants are running with arms, not just machine guns."

However, a Russian video published on 20 June 2017 pointed out strong similarities between the clip Putin played and footage from 2013 of a U.S. Apache helicopter firing at militants in Afghanistan. The striking similarities led people on social media to call the clip "fake" and suggest that the Russian president did not realize what he was showing was not his own forces.

=== Anti-LGBT laws ===
During the interview, Stone said of the Russian gay propaganda law, that "It seems like maybe that's a sensible law." Stone later said he is not anti-gay/LGBTQ.

== Award nominations ==
Jeff Beal was nominated for a 2018 Primetime Emmy Award in the category Outstanding Original Main Title Theme Music and for a 2018 Hollywood Music in Media Awards in the category Best Main Title Theme – TV Show/Limited Series.

== See also ==
- Tucker Carlson's interview with Vladimir Putin
