= List of awards and nominations received by Oliver Stone =

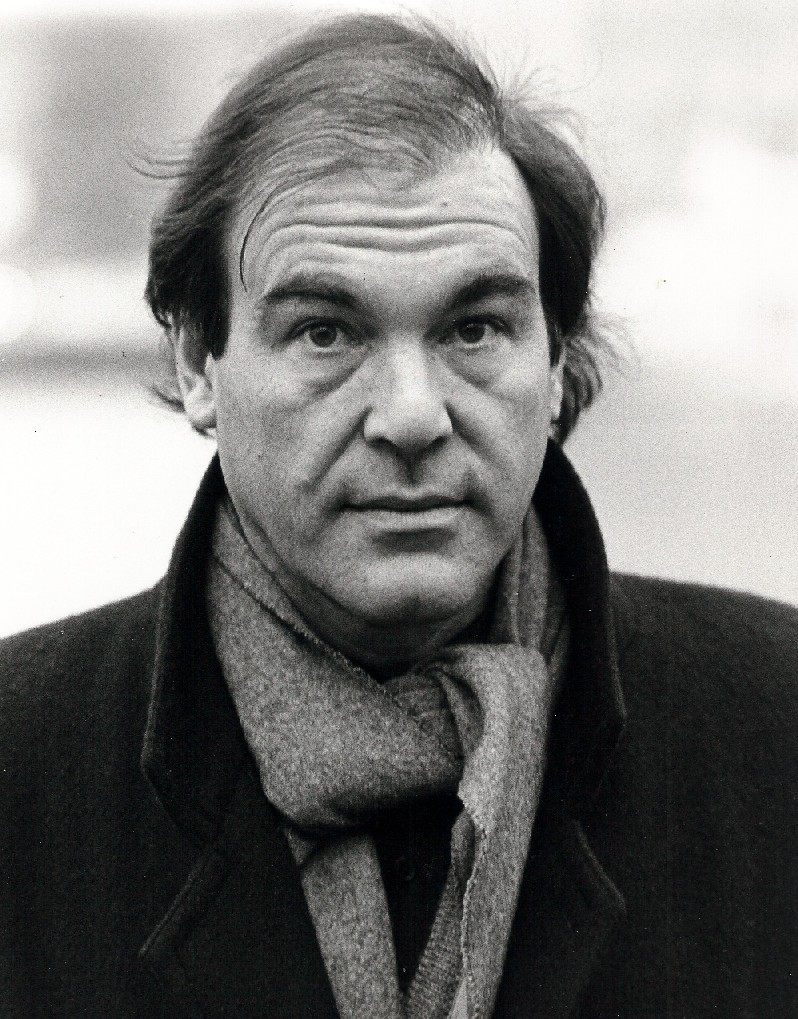
Director Oliver Stone in 2001

Oliver Stone is an American filmmaker. He's directed numerous films such as Salvador (1986), Platoon (1986), Wall Street (1987), Born on the Fourth of July (1989), The Doors (1990), JFK (1991), Heaven & Earth (1993), Natural Born Killers (1994), Nixon (1995), and Any Given Sunday (1999). His recent films include Alexander (2004), World Trade Center (2006), W. (2008), Wall Street: Money Never Sleeps (2010), Savages (2012), and Snowden (2016). Stone has also directed numerous documentary films.

Stone has received numerous accolades including three Academy Awards; for Best Adapted Screenplay for Midnight Express (1978) and Best Director twice for Platoon (1986) and Born on the Fourth of July (1989). He has also received a BAFTA Award, a Primetime Emmy Award, six Golden Globe Awards (the most for any non-performer), and two Directors Guild of America Awards.

== Major associations ==
=== Academy Awards ===
| Year | Category | Nominated work | Result | Ref. |
|---|---|---|---|---|
| 1979 | Best Adapted Screenplay | Midnight Express | Won | |
| 1987 | Best Director | Platoon | Won | |
| 1987 | Best Original Screenplay | Platoon | Nominated | |
| 1987 | Best Original Screenplay | Salvador | Nominated | |
| 1990 | Best Picture | Born on the Fourth of July | Nominated | |
| 1990 | Best Director | Born on the Fourth of July | Won | |
| 1990 | Best Adapted Screenplay | Born on the Fourth of July | Nominated | |
| 1992 | Best Picture | JFK | Nominated | |
| 1992 | Best Director | JFK | Nominated | |
| 1992 | Best Adapted Screenplay | JFK | Nominated | |
| 1996 | Best Original Screenplay | Nixon | Nominated | |

=== BAFTA Awards ===
| Year | Category | Nominated work | Result | Ref. |
|---|---|---|---|---|
| 1988 | Best Direction | Platoon | Won | |
| 1991 | Best Adapted Screenplay | Born on the Fourth of July | Nominated | |
| 1993 | Best Adapted Screenplay | JFK | Nominated | |
| 1997 | Best Adapted Screenplay | Evita | Nominated | |

=== Emmy Awards ===
Primetime Emmy Award
| Year | Category | Nominated work | Result | Ref. |
|---|---|---|---|---|
| 1995 | Outstanding Television Movie | Indictment: The McMartin Trial | Won | |

=== Golden Globe Awards ===
| Year | Category | Nominated work | Result | Ref. |
|---|---|---|---|---|
| 1979 | Best Screenplay | Midnight Express | Won | |
| 1987 | Best Director | Platoon | Won | |
| 1987 | Best Screenplay | Platoon | Nominated | |
| 1990 | Best Director | Born on the Fourth of July | Won | |
| 1990 | Best Screenplay | Born on the Fourth of July | Won | |
| 1990 | Best Motion Picture - Drama | Born on the Fourth of July | Won | |
| 1992 | Best Director | JFK | Won | |
| 1992 | Best Screenplay | JFK | Nominated | |
| 1995 | Best Director | Natural Born Killers | Nominated | |

=== Grammy Awards ===
| Year | Category | Nominated work | Result | Ref. |
|---|---|---|---|---|
| 1979 | Best Score Soundtrack for Visual Media | Midnight Express | Nominated | |

== Guild awards ==
Directors Guild of America
| Year | Category | Nominated work | Result |
|---|---|---|---|
| 1986 | Best Director - Feature Film | Platoon | Won |
| 1989 | Best Director - Feature Film | Born on the Fourth of July | Won |
| 1991 | Best Director - Feature Film | JFK | Nominated |

Writers Guild of America
| Year | Category | Nominated work | Result |
|---|---|---|---|
| 1978 | Best Adapted Screenplay | Midnight Express | Won |
| 1986 | Best Original Screenplay | Salvador | Nominated |
| 1986 | Best Original Screenplay | Platoon | Nominated |
| 1989 | Best Original Screenplay | Born on the Fourth of July | Nominated |
| 1991 | Best Adapted Screenplay | JFK | Nominated |
| 2017 | Laurel Award for Screen Writing Achievement | | Honored |

== Festival awards ==
Berlin Film Festival
| Year | Category | Nominated work | Result |
|---|---|---|---|
| 1986 | Golden Bear | Platoon | Nominated |
| 1986 | Silver Bear | Platoon | Won |
| 1988 | Golden Bear | Talk Radio | Nominated |
| 1989 | Golden Bear | Born on the Fourth of July | Nominated |
| 1990 | Honorary Golden Bear | | Won |
| 1999 | Golden Bear | Any Given Sunday | Nominated |

Cannes Film Festival
| Year | Category | Nominated work | Result |
|---|---|---|---|
| 2021 | Golden Eye | JFK: Revisted | Nominated |

Cairo International Film Festival
| Year | Category | Result |
|---|---|---|
| 1994 | Career Achievement Award | Won |

Venice Film Festival
| Year | Category | Nominated work | Result |
|---|---|---|---|
| 1994 | Golden Lion | Natural Born Killers | Nominated |
| 1994 | Grand Jury Prize | Natural Born Killers | Won |
| 2022 | Enrico Fulchignoni | | Won |

== Miscellaneous accolades ==
Independent Spirit Awards
| Year | Category | Nominated work | Result |
|---|---|---|---|
| 1986 | Best Feature | Platoon | Won |
| 1986 | Best Feature | Salvador | Nominated |
| 1986 | Best Director | Platoon | Won |
| 1986 | Best Director | Salvador | Nominated |
| 1986 | Best Screenplay | Platoon | Won |
| 1986 | Best Screenplay | Salvador | Nominated |
| 1988 | Best Director | Talk Radio | Nominated |

Golden Raspberry Awards
| Year | Category | Nominated work | Result |
|---|---|---|---|
| 1985 | Worst Screenplay | Year of the Dragon | Nominated |
| 1997 | Worst Director | U Turn | Nominated |
| 2004 | Worst Director | Alexander | Nominated |
| 2004 | Worst Screenplay | Alexander | Nominated |

== Critical reception ==
| Year | Title | Rotten Tomatoes | Metacritic |
|---|---|---|---|
| 1974 | Seizure | —N/a | —N/a |
| 1981 | The Hand | 29% | 59% |
| 1986 | Salvador | 90% | 69% |
| 1986 | Platoon | 89% | 92% |
| 1987 | Wall Street | 79% | 56% |
| 1988 | Talk Radio | 82% | 66% |
| 1989 | Born on the Fourth of July | 85% | 75% |
| 1991 | The Doors | 56% | 62% |
| 1991 | JFK | 84% | 72% |
| 1993 | Heaven & Earth | 43% | —N/a |
| 1994 | Natural Born Killers | 49% | 74% |
| 1995 | Nixon | 75% | 66% |
| 1997 | U Turn | 59% | 54% |
| 1999 | Any Given Sunday | 52% | 52% |
| 2004 | Alexander | 16% | 40% |
| 2006 | World Trade Center | 66% | 66% |
| 2008 | W. | 58% | 56% |
| 2010 | Wall Street: Money Never Sleeps | 55% | 59% |
| 2012 | Savages | 50% | 59% |
| 2016 | Snowden | 61% | 58% |
