= Persona Non Grata (2003 film) =

- Directed by: Oliver Stone
- Starring: Yasser Arafat; Ehud Barak; Benjamin Netanyahu; Shimon Peres; Oliver Stone; Jasan Yosef
- Narrated by: Oliver Stone
- Music by: Claude Chalhoub
- Country of origin: United States; France; Spain
- Original language: English

Production
- Producer: Fernando Sulichin
- Cinematography: Rodrigo Prieto; Serguei Saldívar Tanaka
- Editor: Langdon Page
- Running time: 67 minutes
- Production companies: Ixtlan; Morena Films; Rule 8 Wild Bunch

Original release
- Network: HBO
- Release: June 5, 2003

Persona Non Grata is a 2003 documentary film directed by Oliver Stone for the HBO series America Undercover about the Israeli–Palestinian conflict. It is a highly personal journey in occupied Palestinian territories, including interviews of Palestinian President Yasser Arafat, Israeli Prime Ministers Ehud Barak and Benjamin Netanyahu, but also of Hamas and Al-Aqsa Martyrs Brigades militants.

The film was presented as a special event in the New Territories section of the 60th Venice International Film Festival.
