= Mi amigo Hugo =

2014 television film directed by Oliver Stone

- Directed by: Oliver Stone
- Music by: Adam Peters
- Country of origin: Venezuela
- Original languages: English; Spanish

Production
- Running time: 52 minutes

Original release
- Network: Telesur
- Release: 2014

Mi amigo Hugo is a Venezuelan television documentary about Venezuelan president Hugo Chávez, produced by the Venezuelan government propaganda network Telesur and directed by Chavez's friend Oliver Stone.

== Production ==
The documentary is a short look at the intimate life of Chávez, featuring interviews with his family, friends, and other Latin American politicians. Stone features in much of the film, conversing and embracing Chávez around different sites in Venezuela, with other notable people, like Fidel Castro, Nicolás Maduro, José Vicente Rangel, and Elías Jaua, making smaller appearances.

The film was first shown on TeleSur on the first anniversary of Chávez' death, 5 March 2014.

== Analysis ==
Cory Franklin, editorial member of the Chicago Tribune and Washington Examiner, calls director Stone "Chavez's most ardent cheerleader" (sic), and describes the film as "worshipful" towards the leader and a "fulsome love paean"; it concludes that the film is cringeworthy, particularly in retrospect.

Jeffrey Tayler was critical of the film because he believed it would give support to Venezuela's supposed deification of Chávez at the time when the nation's economy was beginning to worsen and both citizens and the government "need to start reassessing their departed leader and begin thinking critically of the way ahead [...] the absolute last thing Venezuelans, or anyone else, needs is more Chávez agitprop". He also questioned Stone's ignorance of what he asserts were lies told straight to his face, and concludes that Stone "needs to evolve".

== See also ==
- South of the Border
