= JFK Revisited: Through the Looking Glass =

2021 documentary film by Oliver Stone

- Theatrical release poster
- Directed by: Oliver Stone
- Written by: Oliver Stone (structure)
- Based on: Destiny Betrayed: JFK, Cuba, and the Garrison Case by James DiEugenio
- Produced by: Robert S. Wilson
- Narrated by: Whoopi Goldberg; Donald Sutherland
- Cinematography: Robert Richardson
- Edited by: Kurt Mattila
- Music by: Jeff Beal
- Production companies: Ixtlan Productions; Pantagruel Productions; Ingenious Media
- Distributed by: Altitude Film Distribution
- Release dates: July 12, 2021 (Cannes); November 12, 2021 (United States)
- Running time: 118 minutes
- Countries: United States; United Kingdom
- Language: English

JFK Revisited: Through the Looking Glass is a 2021 documentary film about the assassination of John F. Kennedy directed by Oliver Stone, based on the 1992 non-fiction book Destiny Betrayed: JFK, Cuba, and the Garrison Case by James DiEugenio and on newly declassified evidence about the case. It premiered on July 12, 2021, in the Cannes Premiere section at the 2021 Cannes Film Festival.

Stone described it as "an important bookend to my 1991 film. It ties up many loose threads, and hopefully repudiates much of the ignorance around the case and the movie". Originally conceived as a four-hour epic under the title JFK: Destiny Betrayed, the film is narrated by Whoopi Goldberg and Donald Sutherland.

== Synopsis ==
After the 1991 film JFK, Congress enacts the President John F. Kennedy Assassination Records Collection Act of 1992, establishing a review board to declassify assassination-related documents. The film disputes the chain of evidence for the "single bullet" that caused wounds to Kennedy and Governor John Connally. Researcher Barry Ernest, author of the 2010 JFK book The Girl on the Stairs, is interviewed about alleged witness statements purportedly casting doubt on the timeline of Lee Harvey Oswald's movements immediately after the assassination.

Interviewees featured in the film include:

- John R. Tunheim
- Dr. Henry Lee
- Robert F. Kennedy, Jr., nephew of President John F. Kennedy.
- James K. Galbraith
- David Talbot
- Cyril Wecht

== Production ==
The film was produced by Ixtlan Productions and Pantagruel Productions with funding by Ingenious Media.

== Release ==
It was released on video on demand on November 12, 2021, and was televised on Showtime on November 22, 2021. It was theatrically released in the U.K. and Ireland by Altitude Film Distribution on November 26, 2021.

== Reception ==
On the review aggregator website Rotten Tomatoes, 63% of 27 critics' reviews are positive, with an average rating of 6.1/10. The website's consensus reads: "Although it's frustratingly casual with the line between facts and conjecture, JFK Revisited: Through the Looking Glass reaffirms Oliver Stone's gifts as an engaging raconteur." Metacritic, which uses a weighted average, assigned the film a score of 55 out of 100, based on 7 critics, indicating "mixed or average" reviews.

== See also ==
- Assassination of John F. Kennedy in popular culture
