= James DiEugenio =

American historian, screenwriter and JFK assassination researcher (born 1952)

James DiEugenio is an American historian, author and screenwriter. He has written extensively on the assassination of U.S. President John F. Kennedy. His books include Destiny Betrayed (1992/2012) and Reclaiming Parkland (2013); the latter was revised and expanded in a 2018 edition, The JFK Assassination: The Evidence Today.

In 2021 DiEugenio wrote the screenplay for Oliver Stone's documentary film, JFK Revisited: Through the Looking Glass, and its follow-up, JFK: Destiny Betrayed. Like Stone, DiEugenio is categorized as a conspiracy theorist who believes the JFK assassination was a U.S. intelligence operation to prevent Kennedy's break with Cold War foreign policy. Since 2003, DiEugenio has edited two websites that post book reviews and research articles on the political assassinations of the 1960s.

== Biography ==
=== Early life and education ===
James DiEugenio was born in Erie, Pennsylvania in 1952, the son of Anthony DiEugenio and Florida "Flo" Berarducci. In one of his book dedications, he thanked his aunt and uncle, Ernesta and Louis Spong, for raising him. He obtained undergraduate degrees in Education and Film and an MA from California State University, Northridge in Contemporary American History. He became a history teacher. He later said that he started researching the JFK assassination as far back as 1972.

=== Destiny Betrayed ===
DiEugenio's first book, Destiny Betrayed: JFK, Cuba, and the Garrison Case (1992), chronicles the unsuccessful prosecution by New Orleans District Attorney Jim Garrison of Clay Shaw for conspiring to kill President Kennedy. The book offers a spirited defense of Garrison, claiming the New Orleans DA was unjustly maligned, both by defenders of the Warren Commission and by its critics. DiEugenio alleges that the media attacks on Garrison for corruption and other abuses of his office

were part of an orchestrated smear campaign by the CIA. An Agency memorandum, #1035-960, dated April 1, 1967 and directed to all station chiefs, laid out a plan to use Agency "propaganda assets" in the media...to discredit Warren Commission critics with precisely the kinds of accusations that were used against Garrison.

In DiEugenio's view, the campaign to destroy Garrison's personal credibility fit within a larger strategy of sabotaging his criminal case against Shaw. Destiny Betrayed documents nine CIA assets who infiltrated the DA's office as "volunteers" in the months leading up to Shaw's trial. By the time the trial date arrived in 1969, DiEugenio argues that Garrison's case had been so weakened and compromised, the trial proceedings themselves were an "anticlimax". A second edition of Destiny Betrayed, which DiEugenio claimed was "much better" than the 1992 edition, was published in 2012.

=== Probe magazine and CTKA ===
In the wake of Oliver Stone's film JFK in 1991, and the passage the next year of the JFK Records Act, DiEugenio met with other assassination researchers about the possibility of starting a new magazine. In 1993, they formed the Citizens for Truth about the Kennedy Assassination (CTKA), and launched Probe magazine with DiEugenio serving as co-editor. It was initially focused on the JFK murder with the intent of reporting on the newly available documents declassified by the Assassination Records Review Board (ARRB). But the magazine soon broadened its scope to also cover the MLK, RFK, and Malcolm X assassinations. A common refrain in Probe was that the major political assassinations of the 1960s were carried out with government involvement, and that the mainstream media was complicit by merely repeating the official stories and not performing independent investigation. Along with articles by DiEugenio, the magazine's other contributors included Cyril Wecht, Gaeton Fonzi, James W. Douglass, Bill Davy, John Newman, and Lisa Pease. After Probe ceased publication in 2000, DiEugenio and Pease co-edited the anthology, The Assassinations: Probe Magazine on JFK, MLK, RFK and Malcolm X (2003), which reprinted more than thirty articles from the magazine.

On 17 September 1996, DiEugenio testified at a public hearing of the Assassination Records Review Board in Los Angeles. In 2003 he oversaw creation of a CTKA website, with him as editor. For the next thirteen years, CTKA continued to publish the sorts of assassination research that had appeared in Probe. In December 2016, the site was subjected to a "complete modern overhaul" and replaced by kennedysandking.com, with DiEugenio again serving as editor. Over the decades on both websites, he has reviewed scores of assassination-themed books, films and TV programs, and posted news items, opinion pieces, obituaries, and his own research articles.

=== Reclaiming Parkland ===
DiEugenio's next book was Reclaiming Parkland: Tom Hanks, Vincent Bugliosi, and the JFK Assassination in the New Hollywood (2013); it offers a detailed rebuttal of Bugliosi's massive 2007 volume, Reclaiming History, which defends the Warren Commission's conclusion that Lee Harvey Oswald was the lone assassin. Reclaiming Parkland describes the failed attempt by actor Tom Hanks and producer Gary Goetzman to adapt Bugliosi's book into an HBO miniseries. Hanks and Goetzman eventually developed the film Parkland (2013), but DiEugenio says it deviates from Reclaiming History and he suggests possible reasons why. He explores the connections between Washington and Hollywood, and what he regards as CIA influence on the film industry.

Reclaiming Parkland was not reviewed in the Los Angeles Times, The New York Times (which had effusively praised Bugliosi's book) or other prominent media outlets, and was given only a one-sentence comment in a Washington Post roundup of 32 JFK books published in 2013. In a 2017 conference appearance with DiEugenio, Oliver Stone, who wrote the foreword to Reclaiming Parkland, joked that while he admired the book, he thought it had a "terrible title". In 2018, a revised and expanded edition was published with a new title, The JFK Assassination: The Evidence Today.

=== Film work ===
DiEugenio was a guest commentator on the Blu-ray edition of JFK when it was reissued by Warner Home Video in 2013 to coincide with the 50th anniversary of the assassination. In 2021 he wrote the screenplays for two documentary films directed by Oliver Stone. The first, JFK Revisited: Through the Looking Glass, premiered at the July 2021 Cannes Film Festival, and was aired in November 2021 on Showtime. That same year, Stone released a more in-depth four-part, four-hour TV miniseries called JFK: Destiny Betrayed, again written by DiEugenio. It covered some of the same ground as Stone's 1991 JFK film, but also featured new evidence that had come to light as a result of the ARRB's disclosures. In 2022, DiEugenio was one of the assassination researchers interviewed on-camera in the documentary film, The Assassination & Mrs. Paine.

=== Later life ===
DiEugenio has appeared as a guest on numerous talk shows, and is a regular contributor to Consortium News. He is also a frequent guest on Len Osanic's Black Op Radio. In April 2025, DiEugenio was one of the witnesses called before the House Committee on Oversight and Government Reform to speak about the value of declassifying more JFK files.

In an article in The Atlantic, DiEugenio explained why JFK assassination research had occupied so much of his life: "I really and truly believe that the Kennedy assassination was quite epochal; it had reverberations down to present day. What has happened over time is that cynicism and skepticism have seeped down into the public at large. It has caused a lot of serious problems about peoples' belief in government and has splintered our society."

In his day job DiEugenio was a professional teacher for 30 years. He retired from teaching in the 2010s. He resides in Los Angeles, California.

== Bibliography ==
=== Books ===
- Destiny Betrayed: JFK, Cuba, and the Garrison Case (1st ed.). New York: Sheridan Square Press. 1992. ISBN 1879823004.
- The Assassinations: Probe Magazine on JFK, MLK, RFK and Malcolm X. Port Townsend, Washington: Feral House. 2003. ISBN 978-0922915828. Co-edited with Lisa Pease.
- Destiny Betrayed: JFK, Cuba, and the Garrison Case (2nd ed.). New York: Skyhorse Publishing. 2012. ISBN 978-1620870563.
- Reclaiming Parkland: Tom Hanks, Vincent Bugliosi, and the JFK Assassination in the New Hollywood. Skyhorse Publishing. 2013. ISBN 978-1628738261.
- The JFK Assassination: The Evidence Today (Revised & Expanded ed.). New York: Skyhorse Publishing. 2018. ISBN 978-1510739833.

=== Selected articles ===
- "The Left and the Death of Kennedy". Probe. January–February 1997.
- "The Posthumous Assassination of John F. Kennedy: Judith Exner, Mary Meyer and Other Daggers". Probe. September–October 1997.
- "Fatal Justice: The Death of James Earl Ray" (PDF). Probe. May–June 1998.
- "Dodd and Dulles vs. Kennedy in Africa". Probe. January–February 1999.
- "Rose Cheramie: How She Predicted the JFK Assassination". Probe. July–August 1999.
- "The Media Buries the Conspiracy Verdict in the King Case" (PDF). Probe. January–February 2000.
- "Oliver Stone vs. The Historical Establishment". Probe. July–August 2000.
- "Gerald Posner: Did He Get Anything Right?". CTKA. January 16, 2004.
- "Gaeton Fonzi: The Last Investigation". CTKA. September 1, 2008.
- "James W. Douglass: JFK and the Unspeakable". CTKA. September 1, 2011.
- "On its 50th Anniversary: Why the Warren Report Today is Inoperative, In Five 'Plaques'". CTKA. June 20, 2014.
- "The Back Story of Citizen Koch". Consortium News. July 14, 2014.
- "Jim Garrison: The Beat Goes On". Kennedys and King. September 12, 2018.
