= Oliver Stone =

American filmmaker (born 1946)

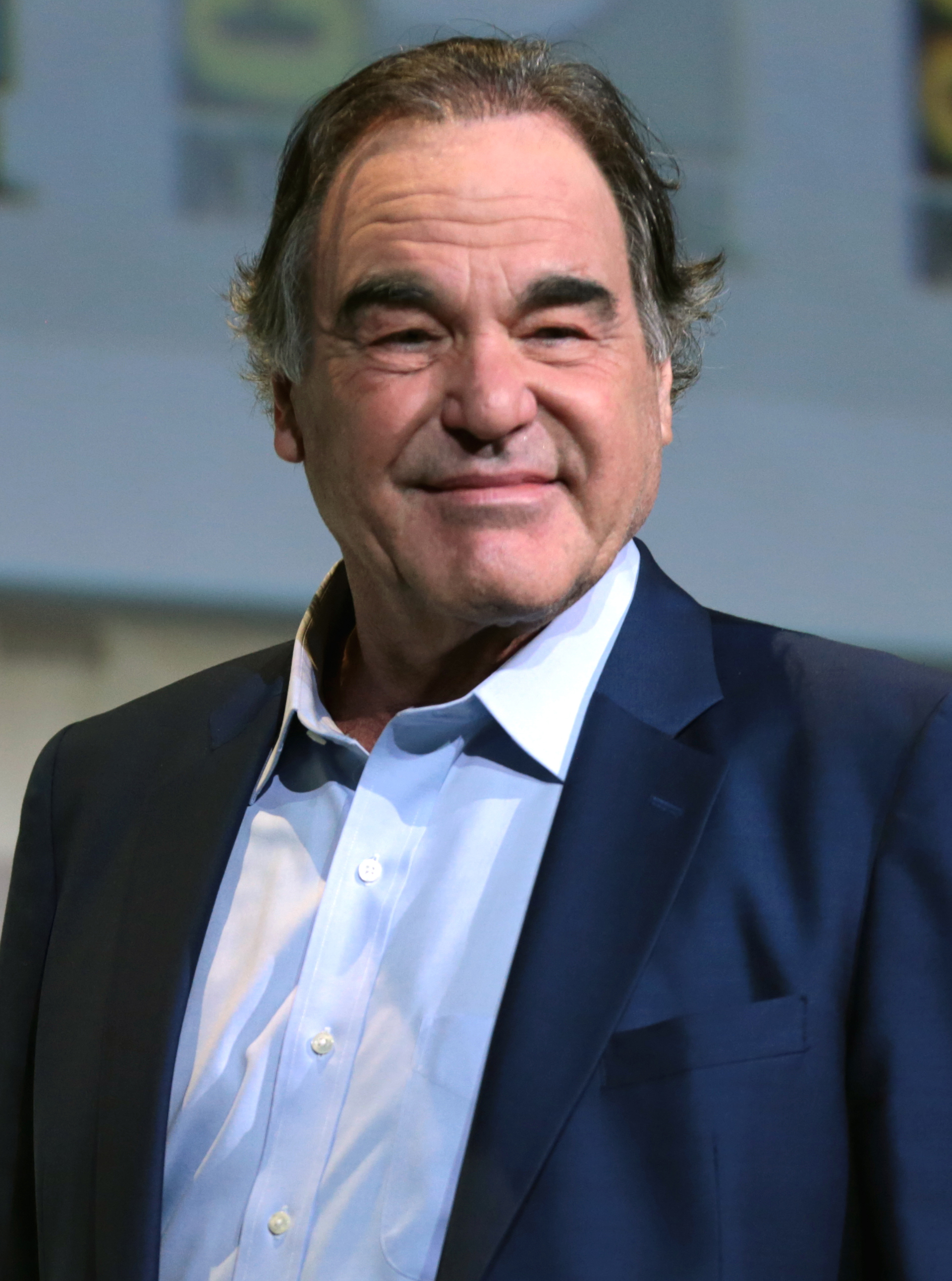
- Stone in 2016
- Born: William Oliver Stone; September 15, 1946 (age 80); New York City, U.S.
- Education: New York University (BFA)
- Occupations: Film director; producer; screenwriter; author
- Years active: 1971–present
- Spouses: Najwa Sarkis (m. 1971; div. 1977); Elizabeth Burkit Cox (m. 1981; div. 1993); Sun-jung Jung (m. 1996)
- Children: 3, including Sean
- Awards: Full list
- Military service
- Allegiance: United States
- Branch: United States Merchant Marine; United States Army
- Service years: 1966 (Merchant Marine); 1967–1973 (Army)
- Rank: Specialist 4
- Units: 25th Infantry Division; 1st Cavalry Division
- Conflicts: Vietnam War

William Oliver Stone (born September 15, 1946) is an American filmmaker and author. An acclaimed director who tackled subjects ranging from the Vietnam War and American politics to musical biopics and crime dramas, Stone has received numerous accolades including three Academy Awards (plus ten career nominations), a BAFTA Award, a Primetime Emmy, a Satellite Award, a Sant Jordi Award, three Jupiter Awards, three Independent Spirit Awards, and six Golden Globe Awards.

Stone was born in New York City and later briefly attended Yale University. In 1967, Stone enlisted in the United States Army during the Vietnam War. He served from 1967 to 1968 in the 25th Infantry and 1st Cavalry Divisions and was twice wounded in action. For his service, he received military honors including a Bronze Star with "V" Device for valor, Purple Heart with Oak Leaf Cluster (to denote two wounds), an Air Medal and the Combat Infantryman Badge. His service in Vietnam became the foundation for the stark portrayals of war and its aftermath in his work.

Stone began his career as a screenwriter for films such as Midnight Express (1978), for which he won the Academy Award for Best Adapted Screenplay, Conan the Barbarian (1982) and Scarface (1983). He then rose to prominence as writer and director of the Vietnam War film dramas Platoon (1986) and Born on the Fourth of July (1989), receiving Academy Awards for Best Director for both films, the former of which also won Best Picture. He also directed Salvador (1986), Wall Street (1987) and its sequel Wall Street: Money Never Sleeps (2010), The Doors (1991), JFK (1991), Heaven & Earth (1993), Natural Born Killers (1994), Nixon (1995), Any Given Sunday (1999), W. (2008) and Snowden (2016). Collectively, his films have grossed $1.3 billion worldwide.

Many of Stone's films focus on controversial American political issues during the late 20th century, and as such were considered contentious at the times of their releases. Stone has been critical of American foreign policy, which he considers to be driven by nationalist and imperialist agendas. Like his subject matter, Stone is a controversial figure in American filmmaking, with some critics accusing him of promoting conspiracy theories.

== Early life, education, and military service ==
William Oliver Stone was born on September 15, 1946, at Doctors Hospital in Yorkville, Manhattan in New York City. He is the only child of Jacqueline (née Goddet) and Louis Stone (born Abraham Louis Silverstein). His parents met in his mother's hometown of Paris during World War II where his father, a U.S. Army colonel, served as a financial officer on General Eisenhower's staff. Upon his return to Manhattan after the war, Louis worked on Wall Street as a stockbroker and investment analyst, eventually becoming vice president of Shearson Lehman Brothers.

Stone's paternal great-grandparents were Ashkenazi Jewish immigrants from Poland. His grandfather, Joshua Silverstein, ran successful skirt-making businesses in New York City and New Jersey. The family changed its surname from Silverstein to Stone in the 1920s due to pervasive antisemitism in the United States. His aunt was author and editor Babette Rosmond; his cousins are writer Gene Stone and former chairman of the U.S. Commodity Futures Trading Commission James Stone. Stone himself grew up in Manhattan and Stamford, Connecticut. While his American father was Jewish, his French mother was Roman Catholic, though both were non-practicing. Stone was raised in the Episcopal Church and now practices Buddhism.

Stone attended kindergarten through eighth grade at Trinity School in New York City before being sent to The Hill School, a college-preparatory boarding school in Pottstown, Pennsylvania. He spoke French as his first language, which led to some difficulties as an ESL learner during his early years at Trinity. His father paid him a quarter every week to write one to two pages on a theme; this inspired Stone's early love of writing.

Starting at age nine, his primary caretaker was a male nanny, Karlo Stojanac. A Yugoslavian Holocaust survivor, Stojanac was both openly gay and a socialist, uncommon traits in that time period. Stone later described his nanny as having a fluctuating gender identity, as well as suffering post-traumatic stress from his experiences in a concentration camp. Reflecting on their bond, Stone described their relationship as "extraordinarily close", and said that Stojanac "was my mentor in many ways. He took care of me and he loved me."

In 1962, while Stone was attending The Hill, his parents abruptly divorced, which shocked him. Following a court ruling that deemed his mother unfit, his father was granted sole custody. With his mother already frequently absent prior to the divorce, Stone was raised under the strong influence of his father, which may explain why father-son relationships are a recurring theme in his work.

Stone often spent summers with his maternal grandparents in France, both in Paris and La Ferté-sous-Jouarre in Seine-et-Marne, where he was fascinated by his grandfather's stories of serving in the French Army during World War I. At 17, he worked as a runner in the Paris Commodities Exchange, a job that later proved inspirational for his film Wall Street. Because of the estrangement from his mother, his French grandmother was his primary maternal figure and her death in 1976 deeply affected him: "She loved me, and she’d always loved me and believed in me. That was a big thing. Something happened at [age] 30 with her death. And I became more mature, and my success started to flow from there.”

After graduating from The Hill School in 1964, Stone was admitted to Yale University, but left in June 1965 at age 18 to teach high school students English for six months at the Free Pacific Institute in Saigon, South Vietnam. Afterwards, he worked for a short while as a wiper on a United States Merchant Marine ship in 1966, traveling from Asia to the US across the rough Pacific Ocean in January. He returned to Yale, but dropped out again after one semester (in part due to working on an autobiographical novel A Child's Night Dream, published in 1997 by St. Martin's Press). During this period, Stone also battled severe depression and suicidal ideation. He would continue to have episodes of major depression throughout his life: “I was lost for a long time, and I stayed lost."

=== U.S. Army ===
In April 1967, Stone enlisted in the United States Army and requested combat duty in Vietnam. Upon arrival, he first served (from September 27, 1967 – February 23, 1968) as a infantryman with 2nd Platoon, B Company, 3rd Battalion, 22nd Infantry Regiment, 25th Infantry Division. In October 1967, he was medevaced for the first time after being shot in the neck during a night ambush, a wound which nearly severed his jugular vein and carotid artery. "It was a miracle I survived the neck injury," he reflected in 2025. Later, while fighting with that same unit in the New Year's Battle of 1968, Stone was knocked unconscious and had his eardrum perforated by the concussive blast of a beehive round, which resulted in permanent deafness in that ear. (As he did not leave duty or receive medical treatment, this injury did not qualify for a Purple Heart. As a result, Stone often refers to himself as "twice wounded," referencing only the injuries for which he was hospitalized and received Purple Hearts). On January 15, 1968, Stone was wounded and evacuated from the 25th Infantry Division for the final time when, while attempting to aid other injured personnel, a satchel charge implanted in a tree detonated, causing a blast concussion and shrapnel wounds to his legs and buttocks.

In the 1990s, biographer James Riordan discovered correspondence from the Treasury Department of the American Consulate in Hong Kong dated 1968, revealing that Louis Stone had used his government connections to request a noncombat transfer for his son following his injuries. However, the letter stated that Oliver emphatically declined the offered support position with the CIA and emphasized his commitment to his military service.

Following a month-long hospital stay, Stone briefly served transitional duty as a military policeman in Saigon. He was then transferred to the 1st Cavalry Division, participating in long-range reconnaissance patrols, before being transferred to Troop D, 1st Squadron of the 9th Cavalry Regiment of the 1st Cav for the rest of his tour. While serving with that unit on August 21, 1968, Stone charged and killed a North Vietnamese sniper who had several squads pinned down during a crossfire firefight near My Khe beach (nicknamed "China Beach" by the U.S.). For that action, he was awarded the Bronze Star with "V" Device for "heroism in ground combat."

Following a voluntary three-month extension of his tour, Stone was separated from active duty on November 15, 1968, and (after five years of Individual Ready Reserve status) officially discharged from the Army on April 1, 1973, at the rank of Specialist 4. In addition to the Bronze Star, his military awards include the Purple Heart with Oak Leaf Cluster to denote two awards, the Air Medal, the Army Commendation Medal, Sharpshooter Badge with Rifle Bar, Marksman Badge with Auto Rifle Bar, the National Defense Service Medal, the Vietnam Service Medal with one Silver Service Star, the Republic of Vietnam Gallantry Cross with Unit Citation with Palm, two Overseas Service Bars, the Vietnam Campaign Medal and the Combat Infantryman Badge.

=== After the war ===
On June 30, 1969, the French news program Voila interviewed a then-unknown Stone while filming "on the street" interviews about the war in Central Park. In fluent French, he told them, "My name is Oliver Stone, I’m 22 years old, I’m from New York, and my mother is French from Paris. I served in Vietnam with the American Army for 15 months and I returned to the United States six months ago. It changed me. It changes a lot of boys." He added that drug use was rampant among American soldiers.

Following the war, Stone suffered from post-traumatic stress disorder. His PTSD was compounded by a violent mugging he experienced in the East Village in the summer of 1969, during which he sustained defensive knife wounds. Stone has also described long-term physical complications from his military service, specifically combat induced hearing loss and tinnitus, minor discomfort from shrapnel still embedded in his body, and fertility issues he believes were caused by Agent Orange exposure. He commemorated the 50th anniversary of the Vietnam War's conclusion by sharing his reflections during panel discussions at the Harvard Institute of Politics and San Diego State University's Center for War and Society and in an interview with The Hollywood Reporter.

Stone denied experiencing any hostility upon returning from Vietnam. Instead, he characterized the general attitude to veterans as indifferent, which contributed to his feelings of depression and isolation. In a 2020 BBC interview, he reflected that, despite his later success, he felt his experience as a combat veteran alienated him from both his generation and Hollywood.

== Career ==
=== 1971–1979: Early career and breakthrough ===
Stone attended New York University on the G.I. Bill, graduating with a Bachelor of Fine Arts degree in film in 1971, where his teachers included director and fellow NYU alumnus Martin Scorsese and where he had a small acting role in the comedy The Battle of Love's Return. In Scorsese's class, Stone made a short, well received 12-minute film about a disabled veteran, Last Year in Viet Nam. He later worked varied jobs as a taxi driver, PBS production assistant, messenger, and salesman before making his mark as a screenwriter.

In 1979, Stone was awarded his first Oscar, after adapting true-life prison story Midnight Express into the successful film of the same name for British director Alan Parker (the two men would later collaborate on the 1996 movie of stage musical Evita). The original author and subject of the film, Billy Hayes, said the film's depiction of prison conditions was accurate and that the "message of Midnight Express isn't, 'Don't go to Turkey. It's, 'Don't be an idiot like I was, and try to smuggle drugs.' " Stone later apologized to Turkey for over-dramatizing the script, while standing by the film's stark depiction of the brutality of Turkish prisons.

=== 1980–1989: Established filmmaker and acclaim ===
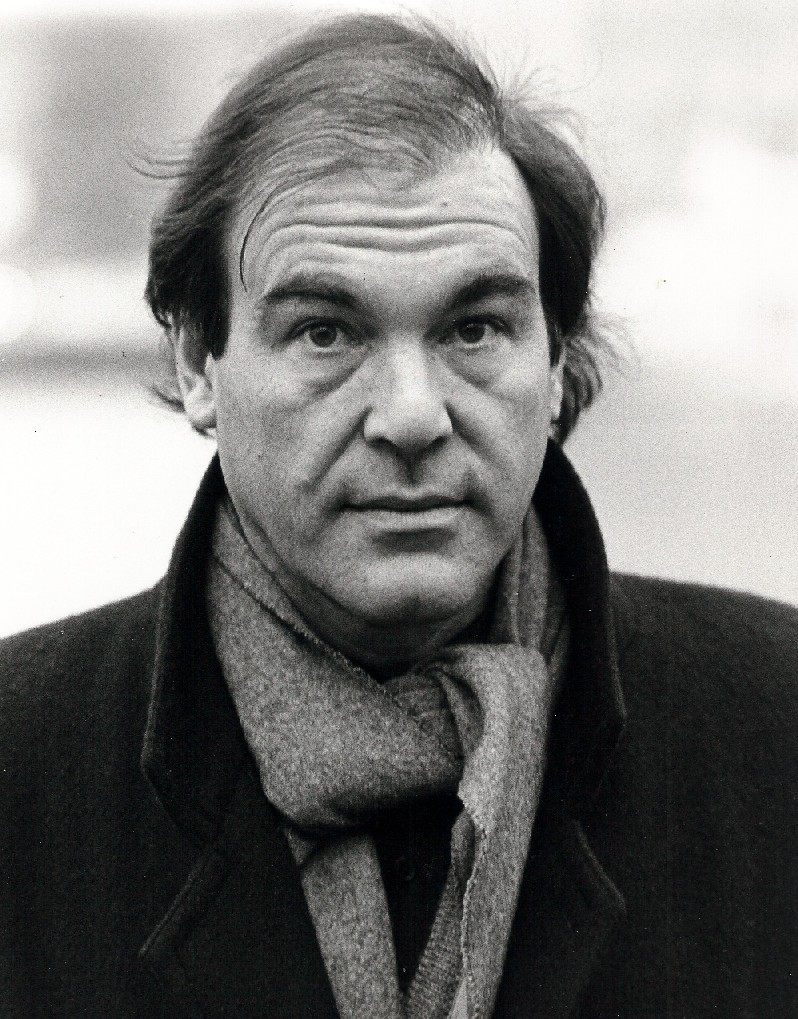
Stone in February 1987

After his breakthrough, Stone continued his successful career as a screenwriter, most notably Brian De Palma's drug lord epic Scarface, loosely inspired by his own addiction to cocaine, which he successfully kicked while working on the screenplay. He also penned Year of the Dragon (co-written with Michael Cimino) featuring Mickey Rourke, before his career took off as a writer-director in 1986. Like his contemporary Michael Mann, Stone is unusual in having written or co-written most of the films he has directed. In 1986, Stone directed two films back to back: the critically acclaimed but commercially unsuccessful Salvador, shot largely in Mexico, and his long in-development Vietnam project Platoon, shot in the Philippines.

Platoon brought Stone's name to a much wider audience. It also kick-started a busy directing career which saw him direct nine films over the next decade. Platoon won rave reviews (Roger Ebert named it the best film of 1986 and later called it the ninth best film of the decade), massive commercial success, and Academy Awards for Best Picture and Best Director. In 2007, a film industry vote ranked it at number 83 in an American Film Institute "AFI's 100 Years ... 100 Movies" poll of the previous century's best American movies. British TV channel Channel 4 voted Platoon as the sixth greatest war film ever made. In 2019, Platoon was selected by the Library of Congress for preservation in the United States National Film Registry for being "culturally, historically, or aesthetically significant."

While Platoon was about Stone's own experience in combat, he followed it with two other films showing different perspectives of the Vietnam War. In 1989, he co-wrote and directed Born on the Fourth of July, based on the autobiography of Ron Kovic, a Marine who became an anti-war activist after being paralyzed in combat. The film was a critical success and received eight Academy Award nominations, including Best Picture, and earned Stone his second Best Director Oscar. At the 47th Golden Globes, Stone became the first filmmaker to win Best Director, Best Screenplay, and Best Picture (as producer) for the same film (the only other filmmaker to achieve the same feat is Paul Thomas Anderson for One Battle After Another). It was also a commercial success, grossing $161 million against a budget of just $17.8 million to become the tenth highest-grossing film of that year. Heaven & Earth (1993) was the final film in his unofficial Vietnam trilogy, written and directed by Stone based on the memoirs of Le Ly Hayslip, a Vietnamese woman whose life was drastically changed by the war and its aftermath.

Immediately following the success of Platoon, Stone co-wrote and directed another hit, 1987's Wall Street, starring Charlie Sheen and Michael Douglas, who received the Academy Award for Best Actor for his role as ruthless corporate raider Gordon Gekko. After Wall Street, Stone co-wrote and directed Talk Radio, based on Eric Bogosian's Pulitzer-nominated play. The film was nominated for the Golden Bear at the Berlin Film Festival and earned Stone his third Independent Spirit Award nomination for Best Director.

=== 1990–2009: Continued work and fluctuations ===
In 1990, Stone produced the Oscar-winning movie Reversal of Fortune. The following year, he co-wrote and directed The Doors. The film received criticism from former Doors keyboardist Ray Manzarek and Jim Morrison's former girlfriend, Patricia Kennealy-Morrison, who was a consultant on the movie (she also makes a cameo appearance). However, she later wrote in her memoir Strange Days: My Life With and Without Jim Morrison that Stone ignored her feedback and proceeded with his own version of events. The other surviving former members of the band, John Densmore and Robby Krieger, also cooperated with the filming of The Doors, but Krieger distanced himself before the film's release. However, Densmore thought highly of the film, and celebrated its DVD release on a panel with Oliver Stone.

During the same year, Stone co-wrote and directed one of his most ambitious, controversial and successful films, JFK, which depicts the assassination of John F. Kennedy on November 22, 1963, and the investigation by Jim Garrison (played by Kevin Costner), who believed that the assassination was part of a CIA conspiracy. The film was a huge commercial success and earned eight Academy Award nominations, including Best Picture and Best Director. Stone also published an annotated version of the screenplay shortly after the film's release, noting, "I make my films like you're going to die if you miss the next minute. You better not go get popcorn." Due to public reaction to the film, Congress passed the President John F. Kennedy Assassination Records Collection Act of 1992 ("JFK Records Act"), directing the National Archives and Records Administration to collect and house all assassination-related records and release them by 2017. The act also established the Assassination Records Review Board (ARRB), whose work was the subject of Stone's 2021 documentary miniseries JFK: Destiny Betrayed. On April 27, 1992, Stone testified before the House Government Operations Subcommittee on Legislation and National Affairs in support of the act's passage. Introducing Stone at the hearing, chairman Rep. John Conyers Jr. stated: "You are probably the reason that we're all here today. You've moved the country and your Congress to immediate activity."

In 1994, Stone co-wrote and directed Natural Born Killers, a violent crime film intended to satirize the modern media. The film had originally been based on a screenplay by Quentin Tarantino, but underwent significant rewriting by Stone, Richard Rutowski, and David Veloz. Before it was released, the MPAA gave the film an NC-17 rating; this caused Stone to cut four minutes of film footage to obtain an R rating (he eventually released the unrated version on VHS and DVD in 2001). The film was the recipient of the Grand Special Jury Prize at the Venice Film Festival. That same year, Stone appeared in a cameo as himself in the presidential comedy Dave and produced The Joy Luck Club, the first major Hollywood film made by an Asian director and majority Asian cast about a contemporary Asian-American story.

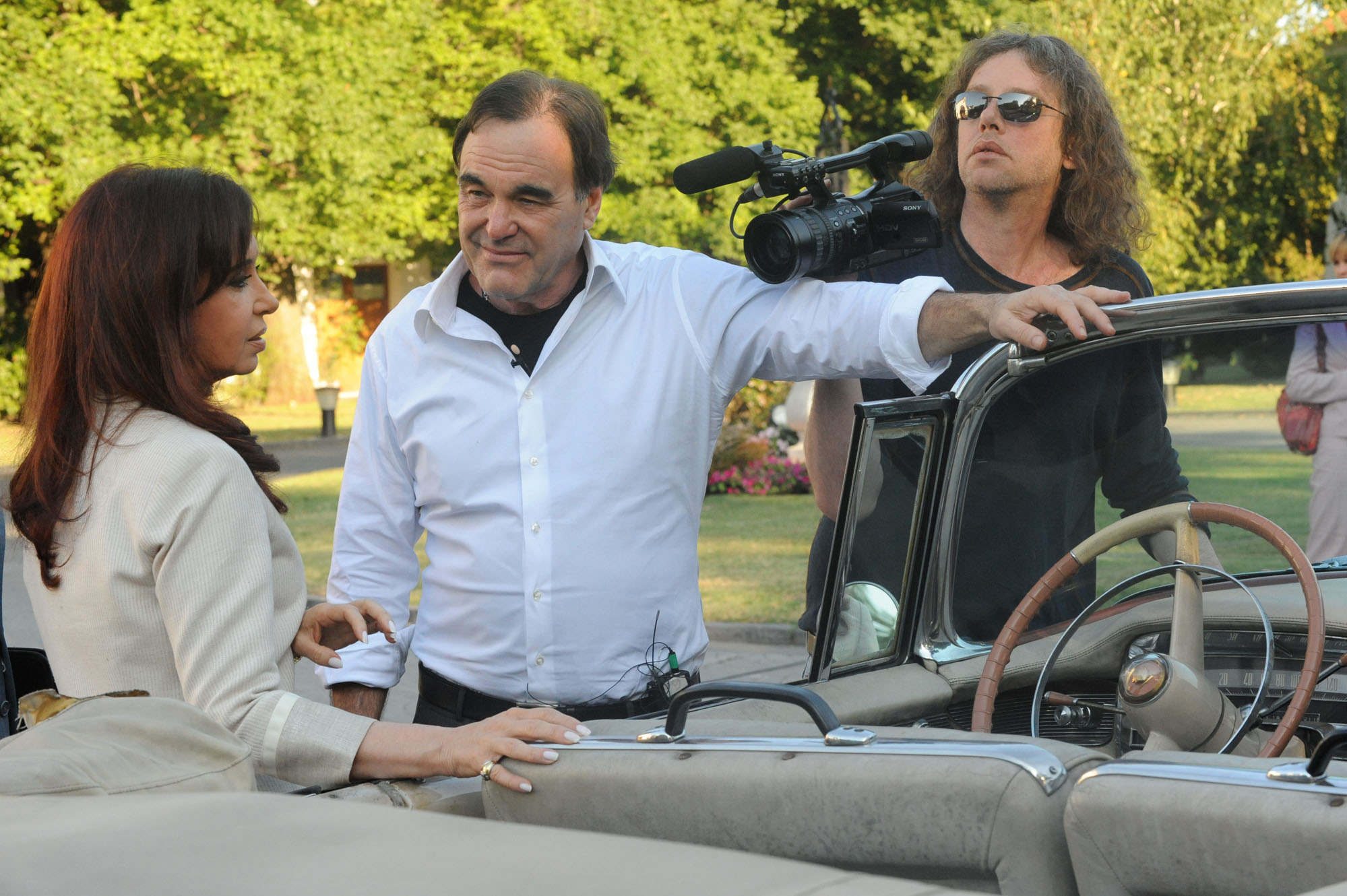
Stone and Argentina's President Cristina Fernández de Kirchner, January 14, 2009

Stone went on to co-write and direct the 1995 Richard Nixon biopic Nixon, which received Oscar nominations for the script, John Williams' score, Joan Allen's performance as Pat Nixon and Anthony Hopkins' portrayal of the title role. He also won a Primetime Emmy Award for Outstanding Television Movie the same year, as executive producer of HBO's Indictment: The McMartin Trial. In 1996, Stone produced the films Freeway and The People vs. Larry Flynt and was credited as co-writer of Evita, which was based on his original adaptation of the stage musical. He finished the decade by co-writing and directing the 1997 film noir U Turn and 1999's Any Given Sunday, a film about power struggles within an American football team.

After over more than a decade (1986–1999), wherein he wrote and directed a new film almost every year, Stone slowed his pace at the turn of the century. He first released his historical epic Alexander in 2004, but it was a notorious box office flop. He later re-edited it into a two-part, 3-hour 37-minute film Alexander Revisited: The Final Cut, which became one of the highest-selling catalog items from Warner Bros. He further refined the film and in 2014 released the two-part, 3-hour 26-minute Alexander: The Ultimate Cut. After Alexander, Stone directed World Trade Center, based on the true story of two PAPD policemen who were trapped in the rubble and survived the September 11 attacks. The film was a commercial success. Stone then wrote and directed the George W. Bush biopic W., which chronicles the president's life up until the 2003 invasion of Iraq.

=== 2010–present: Recent work ===
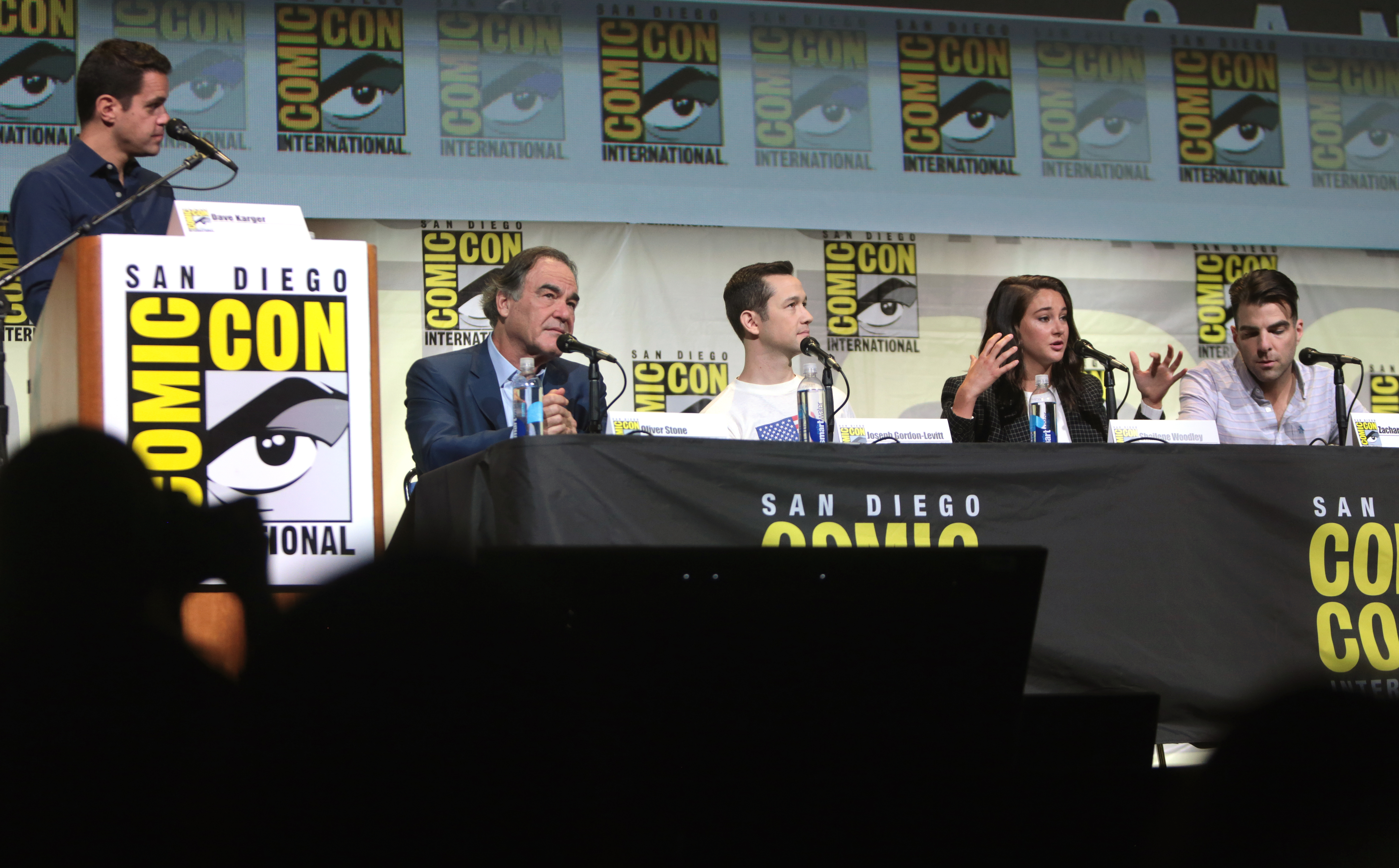
The cast of Snowden speaking at the 2016 San Diego Comic-Con

In 2010, Stone directed his only sequel, Wall Street: Money Never Sleeps. Two years later, he directed the crime thriller Savages, based on the novel by Don Winslow.

In 2016, Stone directed Snowden, starring Joseph Gordon-Levitt as whistleblower Edward Snowden. The film received mixed reviews from critics and was not a commercial success. As of 2025, it remains Stone's final narrative feature film. On May 22, 2017, various industry papers announced that Stone was going to direct his first scripted television series about the Guantanamo detention camp for Weinstein Television. However, Stone quit the project after sexual misconduct allegations surfaced against Harvey Weinstein in October 2017 and it was never made.

In 2020, Stone announced his semi-retirement from film-making, though he still occasionally makes documentaries. In July of that same year, Houghton Mifflin Harcourt published his first memoir, Chasing the Light: Writing, Directing, and Surviving Platoon, Midnight Express, Scarface, Salvador, and the Movie Game, which chronicles his turbulent upbringing in New York City, volunteering for combat in Vietnam, and the trials and triumphs of moviemaking in the 1970s and '80s. The book, which ends on his Oscar-winning Platoon, was praised by The New York Times: "The Oliver Stone depicted in these pages – vulnerable, introspective, stubbornly tenacious and frequently heartbroken—may just be the most sympathetic character he's ever written... neatly sets the stage for the possibility of that rarest of Stone productions: a sequel." In 2024, Stone donated his archives to the Academy of Motion Picture Arts and Sciences.

In 2026, Stone completed production on White Lies, which he has described as his final narrative feature as writer‑director. The film, an autobiographical inter-generational family drama starring Josh Hartnett, Willem Dafoe, Michael Douglas and Ellen Barkin, is characterized as a thematic departure from his earlier politically focused work.

== Documentaries ==
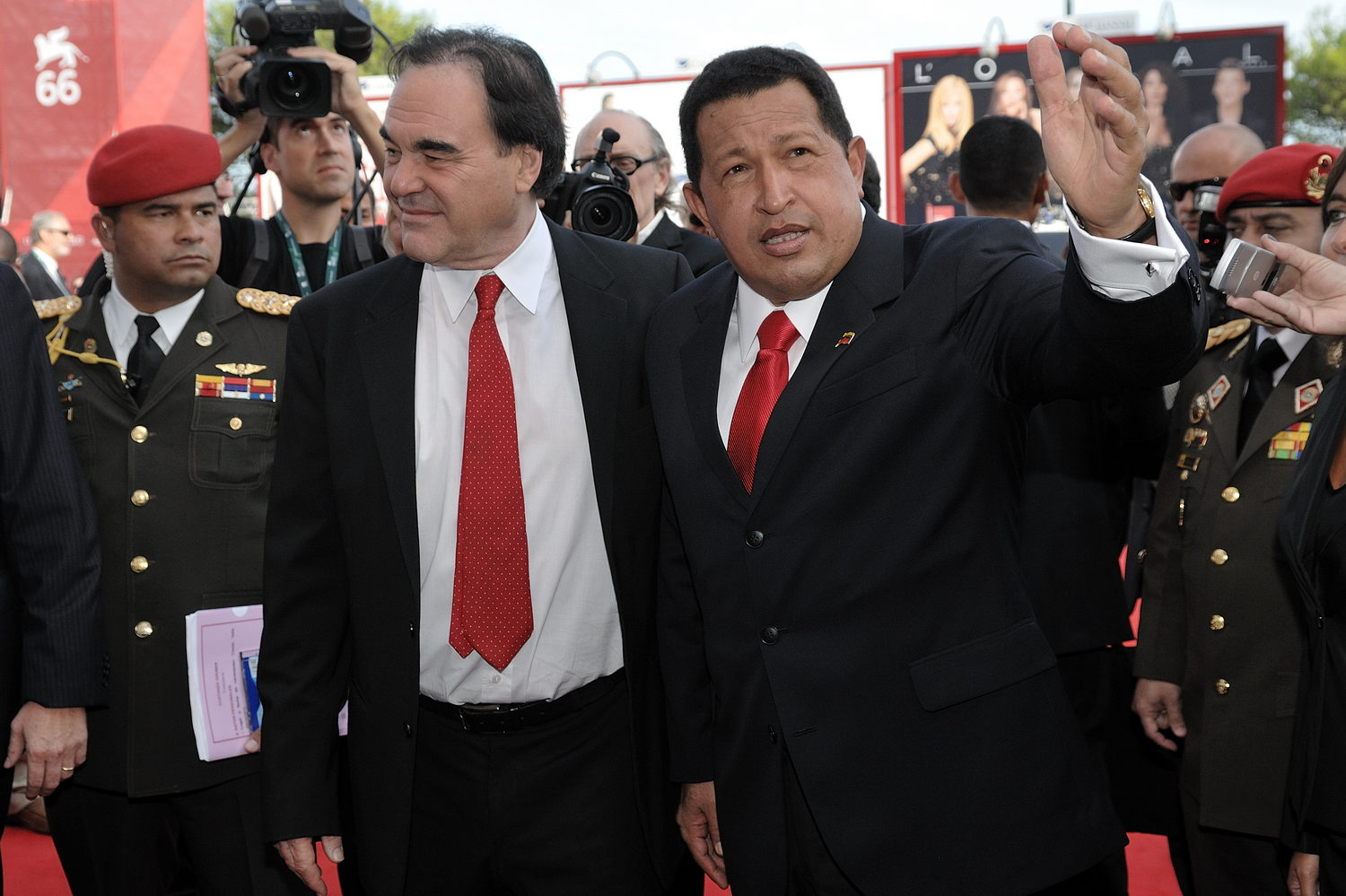
Stone with Hugo Chávez at the Venice International Film Festival, July 9, 2009, for the screening of South of the Border

In the 21st century, Stone increasingly shifted to making documentaries. His first, Comandante (2003), about Cuban leader Fidel Castro, was followed by two sequels: Looking for Fidel (2004) and Castro in Winter (2012). Also in 2003, Stone made Persona Non Grata, an HBO documentary on Israeli-Palestinian relations, in which he interviewed several notable Israeli leaders, including Ehud Barak, Benjamin Netanyahu and Shimon Peres, as well as Yasser Arafat, leader of the Palestine Liberation Organization.

In 2009 Stone completed a feature-length documentary, South of the Border, about the rise of left-wing governments in Latin America, featuring seven presidents: Hugo Chávez of Venezuela, Bolivia's Evo Morales, Ecuador's Rafael Correa, Cuba's Raúl Castro, the Kirchners of Argentina, Brazil's Lula da Silva, and Paraguay's Fernando Lugo, all of whom are critical of US foreign policy in South America. Stone hoped the film would get the rest of the Western world to rethink socialist policies in South America, particularly as it was being applied by Venezuela's Hugo Chávez. Chávez joined Stone for the premiere of the documentary at the Venice International Film Festival in September 2009. Stone defended his decision not to interview Chávez's opponents, stating that oppositional statements and TV clips were scattered through the documentary and that the documentary was an attempt to right a balance of heavily negative coverage. He praised Chávez as a leader of the Bolivarian Revolution, a movement for social transformation in Latin America, and also praised the six other presidents in the film. The documentary was also released in several cities in the United States and Europe in the mid-2010.

In 2012, the documentary miniseries Oliver Stone's Untold History of the United States premiered on Showtime, Stone co-wrote, directed, produced, and narrated the series, having worked on it since 2008 with co-writers American University historian Peter J. Kuznick and British screenwriter Matt Graham. The 10-part series was supplemented by a 750-page companion book of the same name, also written by Stone and Kuznick, published on October 30, 2012, by Simon & Schuster. Stone described the project as "the most ambitious thing I've ever done. Certainly in documentary form, and perhaps in fiction, feature form." The project received positive reviews from former Soviet leader Mikhail Gorbachev, The Guardian journalist Glenn Greenwald, and reviewers from IndieWire, San Francisco Chronicle, and Newsday. Hudson Institute adjunct fellow historian Ronald Radosh accused the series of historical revisionism. Stone defended the program's accuracy to TV host Tavis Smiley by explaining that the series had been vetted three times by different teams of fact checkers.

Stone was interviewed in Boris Malagurski's documentary film The Weight of Chains 2 (2014), which deals with neoliberal reforms in the Balkans.

On March 5, 2014, Stone and teleSUR premiered the documentary film Mi amigo Hugo (My Friend Hugo), a documentary about Venezuela's late president, Hugo Chávez, one year after his death. The film was described by Stone as a "spiritual answer" and tribute to Chávez.

In 2016, Stone was executive producer and interviewer for Ukrainian-born director Igor Lopatonok's film Ukraine on Fire. The film was regarded by critics as presenting a "Kremlin-friendly version" of the 2014 Maidan Revolution in Kyiv. It was also criticized for advancing the Russian narrative about the revolution.

Stone filmed a series of interviews with Russian president Vladimir Putin over the span of two years, which was released as The Putin Interviews, a four episode miniseries, on Showtime on June 12, 2017. On June 13, Stone and Professor Stephen F. Cohen joined John Batchelor in New York to record an hour of commentary on The Putin Interviews. In 2019, he released Revealing Ukraine, another film produced by Stone, directed by Lopatonok and featuring Stone interviewing Putin. During these interviews, Putin made an unproven claim about Georgian snipers being responsible for the February 20 killings of protesters during the Euromaidan demonstrations, a hypothesis Stone himself had earlier supported on Twitter.

In June 2021, Stone's documentary JFK Revisited: Through the Looking Glass was selected to be shown in the Cannes Premiere section at the 2021 Cannes Film Festival. An expanded version of the documentary called JFK: Destiny Betrayed premiered as a television miniseries later that same year.

In 2021, Stone produced and featured in Qazaq: History of the Golden Man, directed by Lopatonok, a miniseries about Kazakh politician and former leader Nursultan Nazarbayev. The series was criticized for its perceived promotion of the authoritarian rule and positive portrayal of Nazarbayev. and for allegedly receiving $5 million in funding from Nazarbayev's own charitable foundation, Elbasy, via the country's State Center for Support of National Cinema, according to the Organized Crime and Corruption Reporting Project. Stone and Lopatonok denied any Kazakhstani government involvement. According to Rolling Stone, "What little attention Qazaq did receive was largely negative, with critics decrying the film for its glowing depiction of Nazarbayev."

In 2022, Stone directed and co-wrote Nuclear Now, a climate change documentary based on the book A Bright Future: How Some Countries Have Solved Climate Change and the Rest Can Follow written by the US scientists Joshua S. Goldstein and Staffan A. Qvist. The movie argues that nuclear energy is needed to fight climate change, as renewables alone will not be sufficient for the planet to obtain carbon neutrality before climate change becomes irreversible. Of the film, Stone stated, "People worry about nuclear waste and meanwhile the whole world is choking on fossil fuel waste. That’s silly. Trillions of dollars have been invested in solar and wind and hydropower. Everything possible is being discussed, except for nuclear... It has to be on the agenda."

In 2024, Stone directed Lula, a documentary film about the life of Luiz Inácio Lula da Silva, the leftist president of Brazil, which premiered at the 2024 Cannes Film Festival. The following year, he served as on-camera interviewer and producer of RFK: Legacy, a documentary about Robert F. Kennedy directed by his son, Sean.

== Other work ==
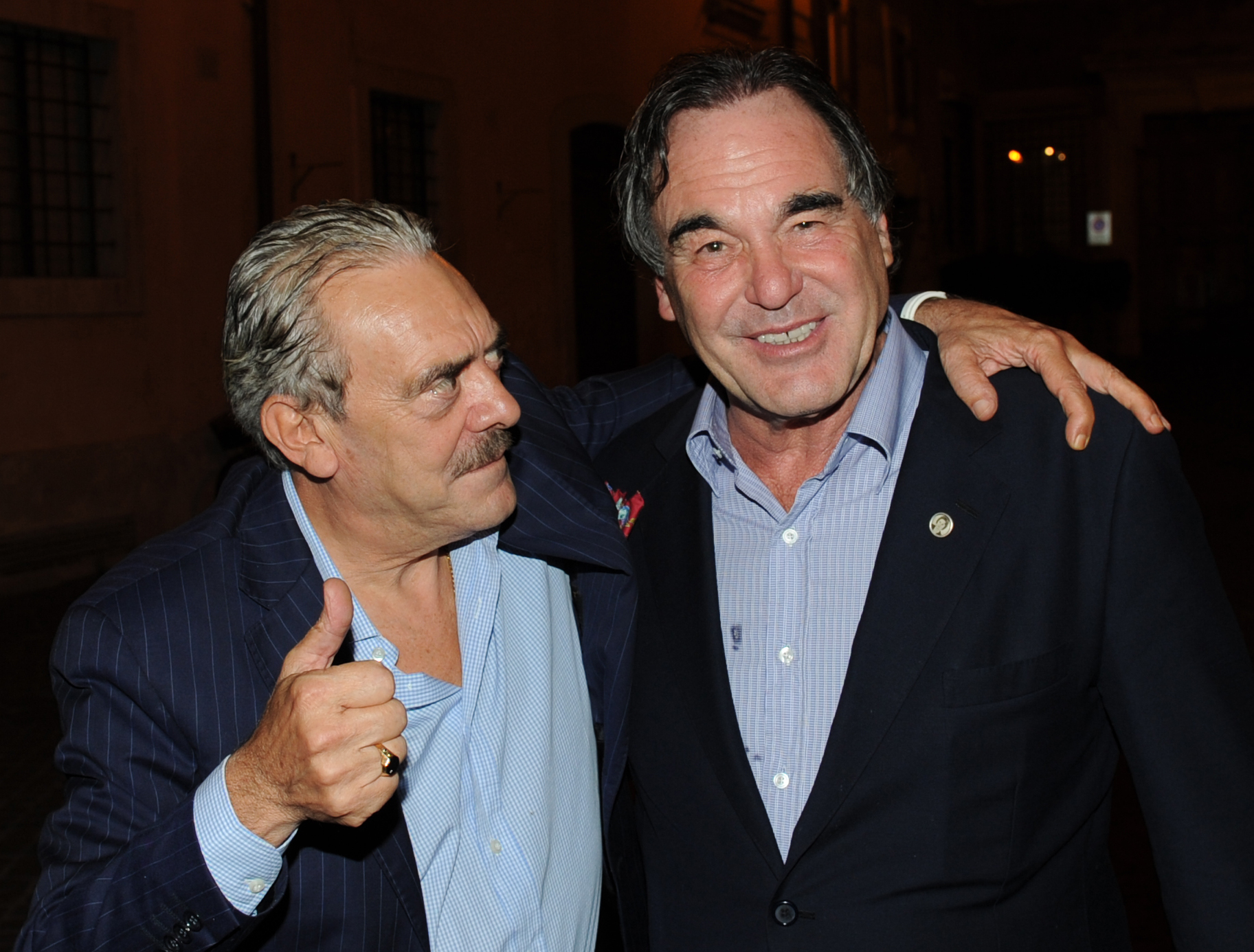
Oliver Stone with Rino Barillari in "Piazza dé Ricci" exit of the restaurant "Pierluigi" in Rome – September 25, 2012

On September 15, 2008, Stone was named the artistic director of New York University's Tisch School of the Arts Asia in Singapore. Stone is also an honorary board member of the nonprofit organizations Veterans for Peace and The National Veterans Foundation.

In November 1997, Stone won an episode of the game show Jeopardy! during "Power Players" theme week, playing on behalf of charity Rock the Vote. As of 2025, that makes him one of only three Academy Award winners who have also won Jeopardy! Calling it one of the most fun experiences of his career, he later admitted that he was high on ecstasy during the game.

Stone has contributed forewords or introductions to multiple non-fiction books, including Last Word: My Indictment of the CIA in the Murder of JFK by Mark Lane,The JFK Assassination, A Portrait of Vietnam by Lou Dematteis, Reclaiming Parkland: Tom Hanks, Vincent Bugliosi, and the JFK Assassination in the New Hollywood, The Plot to Overthrow Venezuela: How the US is Orchestrating a Coup for Oil, JFK: The Last Dissenting Witness and JFK: The CIA, Vietnam, and the Plot to Assassinate John F. Kennedy, which features a quote from Stone on its cover that it "blows the lid right off our 'Official History.'" He has also occasionally written film and literary criticism, beginning in 1972 with a freelance review of Jean Luc-Godard's Breathless for The Village Voice. For The New York Times, he reviewed The Last Emperor and Tom Clancy's novel Executive Orders and, in 1998, wrote an article about conspiracies for John F. Kennedy Jr.'s political magazine George.

In 2022, he appeared in the documentary Theaters of War, discussing the role of the military in Hollywood. Stone was also interviewed in the 2021 ESPN 30 for 30 documentary Once Upon a Time in Queens about the 1986 New York Mets.

== Directorial style and legacy ==
Many of Stone's films focus on controversial American political issues during the late 20th century, and as such were considered contentious at the times of their releases. Known for a bold editing style, his films often combine different camera and film formats within a single scene, as demonstrated in JFK (1991), Natural Born Killers (1994) and Nixon (1995). Roger Ebert called Stone "a filmmaker of feverish energy and limitless technical skills, able to assemble a bewildering array of facts and fancies and compose them into a film without getting bogged down." Owen Gleiberman, who named Nixon the best film of 1995, praised Stone as the most thrilling filmmaker of his era, writing that his movies don't merely entertain, but emotionally and psychologically absorb the audience, similar to the intensity of drugs.

According to Quentin Tarantino, Stone's films are assertive and impactful, meant to make audiences think deeply about their subjects. He compared him to Stanley Kramer, a socially conscious filmmaker from the 1950s and ’60s, except, "Kramer was kind of a clumsy filmmaker and Oliver Stone is cinematically brilliant." Two of Tarantino's favorite films, Year of the Dragon (1985) and 8 Million Ways to Die (1986), were written by Stone. Filmmakers Ari Aster and Christopher Nolan have also cited Stone as an influence on their directing. In a retrospective essay, writer and professor Kiese Laymon argued that Stone constantly subverted portrayals of white saviorism and American masculinity in his filmography, while The Washington Post once described him as "Costa-Gavras meets Frank Capra [...] as fluent with polemic as he is with throat-catching emotion."

Stone was ranked #12 on Vulture's 100 Best Screenwriters of All-Time and #43 on Entertainment Weekly's 50 Greatest Directors, the latter calling him "Orson Welles with a sociopolitical ax to grind."

== Influences ==
Stone has listed Luis Buñuel, Jean-Luc Godard and Claude Chabrol as early film-making heroes, as well as fellow combat veteran turned director Samuel Fuller. Stone has particularly cited Greek-French director Costa-Gavras, to whom he is often compared, as a major influence on his cinematic approach. While studying at NYU, Stone first saw the political thriller Z (1969) when Costa-Gavras and actor Yves Montand visited his film class, and that experience had a significant impact on Stone's admiration for politically engaged filmmaking. When later interviewing Costa-Gavras at the 2025 Los Angeles Greek Film Festival, Stone remembered that visit as one of the most significant events of his life.

In his memoir Chasing the Light, Stone additionally described the profound influence of Elia Kazan's films on his work, as well as the parallels he saw between their life experiences. He also detailed a significant friendship with one of his other idols, Billy Wilder, during the final two decades of Wilder's life. Stone is a longtime friend of fellow New York filmmaker Spike Lee, and is given special thanks in the credits of Lee's film Malcolm X.

== Personal life ==
=== Family ===
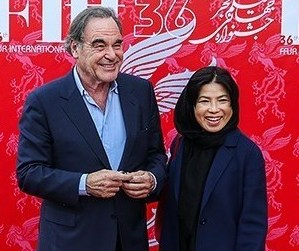
Oliver Stone and his wife Chong at the 2018 Fajr International Film Festival in Tehran

Stone has been married three times, first to Najwa Sarkis Stone, a United Nations protocol attache, on May 22, 1971. They divorced in 1977. He then married Elizabeth Burkit Cox, an assistant in film production, on June 7, 1981. They had two sons, Sean (b. 1984, who took the middle name Ali upon conversion to Islam) and Michael Jack (b. 1991). As a child, Sean acted in supporting roles in several of his father's films, and later worked for the Russia state media company RT America as a program host from 2015 to 2022. Oliver and Elizabeth divorced in 1993. Stone also has a daughter, Tara Chong Stone (b. 1995) with his wife, Chong son Chong (Korean: 정순중, Westernized as Sun-jung Jung), to whom he has been married since 1996. He credits the success of that marriage to his wife being his opposite politically, culturally and spiritually (she is a Christian conservative Republican, originally from South Korea). All of Stone's children had cameos in his films, first as babies and continuing at various ages, though only Any Given Sunday features all three. Stone and his family live in Los Angeles and he holds dual U.S. and French citizenship.

=== Religion and humanism ===
Stone has been a practicing Buddhist since 1993. He was given the Dharma name Minh Duc after receiving the five precepts from a Buddhist monk. Stone is also mentioned in Pulitzer Prize-winning American author Lawrence Wright's book Going Clear: Scientology, Hollywood, and the Prison of Belief as having been a member of Scientology for about a month, due to the influence of a girlfriend: "It was like going to college and reading Dale Carnegie, something you do to find yourself." In 1997, Stone was one of 34 celebrities to sign an open letter to then-German Chancellor Helmut Kohl, published as a newspaper advertisement in the International Herald Tribune, which protested against the treatment of Scientologists in Germany and compared it to the Nazis' oppression of Jews in the 1930s. In 2003, Stone was a signatory of the third Humanist Manifesto.

=== Legal issues and drug use ===
Ten days after returning from Vietnam in November 1968, Stone was arrested and jailed for two weeks in San Diego for attempting to smuggle two ounces of marijuana across the border from Mexico, where he had been partying. The charges were eventually dismissed. The dirty and inhumane conditions he experienced while incarcerated deeply impacted his view of the American justice system. While in the San Diego jail, law enforcement found Stone's military ID among his possessions and, suspecting he was AWOL, turned him over to the Army upon his release. He admitted to keeping the ID card as a souvenir instead of surrendering it during active duty out-processing as required. After spending one night in custody while the Army confirmed his separation status, he was released without penalty.

In 1999, Stone was arrested for driving under the influence of alcohol and possession of drugs, specifically fenfluramine/phentermine, meprobamate and a small amount of hashish. He pled guilty to two counts of driving while intoxicated and was ordered into a rehabilitation program. He was arrested again on the night of May 27, 2005, in Los Angeles for possession of marijuana. He was released the next day on a $15,000 bond. In August 2005, Stone pleaded no contest and was fined $100.

For a brief period in the early 1970s, Stone both used and sold phencyclidine (PCP) out of his apartment in New York. Describing it as "a brief period of employment," he noted, "I was too intellectual a drug dealer, but I met some interesting people." He quit dealing after anarchist writer Emmett Grogan stole his supply during a visit.

From the late 1970s to the early 1980s, Stone was addicted to cocaine. During that time, he also frequently took Quaaludes and was an occasional heroin user. Stone is a long-time and frequent user of marijuana, referring to it as "God's gift" to humanity. He is also an advocate for the use of psychedelics, citing his positive experiences with substances such as LSD, mescaline, psilocybin mushrooms, ayahuasca, and MDMA (ecstasy). For a time, he took what he described as "too much" Prozac but stopped when he felt the antidepressant was no longer effective for him.

=== Sexual harassment allegations ===
In 2017, former Playboy model Carrie Stevens alleged that in 1991, Stone had "walked past me and grabbed my boob as he waltzed out the front door of a party."

The allegation Stevens made surfaced after Stone announced he would no longer direct the Weinstein Company's television series Guantanamo following the revelation of the Harvey Weinstein sexual misconduct allegations. Stone also drew criticism for his comments on Weinstein himself, saying:

I'm a believer that you wait until this thing gets to trial. I believe a man shouldn't be condemned by a vigilante system. It's not easy what he's going through, either. During that period he was a rival. I never did business with him and didn't really know him. I've heard horror stories on everyone in the business, so I'm not going to comment on gossip. I'll wait and see, which is the right thing to do.

Later that day he withdrew his remarks, saying that he had been unaware of the extent of the allegations due to his travel schedule. "After looking at what has been reported in many publications over the last couple of days, I'm appalled and commend the courage of the women who've stepped forward to report sexual abuse or rape."

Melissa Gilbert accused Stone of "sexual harassment" during an audition for The Doors in 1991. Gilbert said that she was told unexpectedly to recite sexually explicit dialogue from the script (as character Pamela Courson), refused and left the audition in tears, calling it humiliating. Stone released a statement denying the accusation. The film's casting director, Risa Bramon Garcia, also denied the story, noting that all actresses and their agents were warned about the explicit dialogue when given the pages prior to the audition, adding, "No actor was forced or expected to do anything that might have been uncomfortable, and most actors embraced the challenge."

== Political views ==
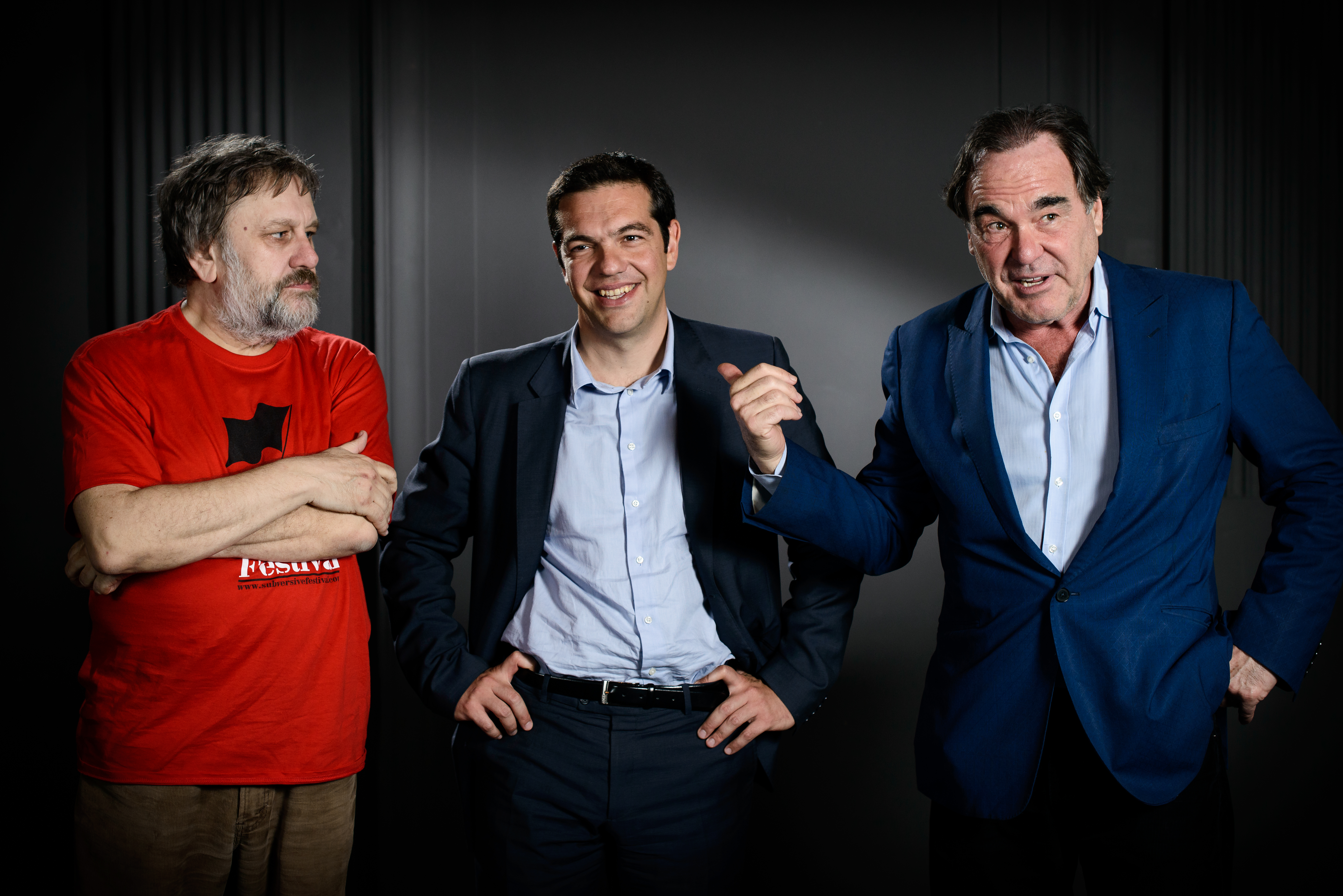
Stone (right) with Slovenian philosopher Slavoj Žižek (left) and Greek politician Alexis Tsipras (center) in 2013

Jeffrey Tayler has described Stone as having left-wing political views. Iranian state media referred to him as an "anti-American system" director. According to the FEC, he has donated over $56,000 to various Democratic candidates and PACs since 1989. (His sole donation to a Republican was to James E. Rogan in 2000.) In a December 2024 podcast interview, Stone defined himself as an independent opposed to neoconservatism and a "real liberal" influenced by John Stuart Mill rather than a Democrat, citing a perceived right-wing shift in the Democratic Party.

Stone has also drawn attention for his opinions on controversial world leaders such as Adolf Hitler, Joseph Stalin, Hugo Chávez and Vladimir Putin. In Showtime's The Putin Interviews, Stone called Joseph Stalin the biggest villain in history, stating that Stalin ruined the legacy of Communism due to his atrocities. Stone has also endorsed the works of author and United States foreign policy critic William Blum, saying that his books should be taught in schools and universities.

=== U.S. presidential politics ===
Stone voted for Ronald Reagan in the 1980 presidential election, but his travels across Central America left him disillusioned with the president's policies by the time of Reagan's 1984 reelection. Stone later campaigned for Michael Dukakis in the 1988 presidential election. In 1992, he served as a delegate for Jerry Brown's campaign in the Democratic Party presidential primaries and spoke at that year's Democratic National Convention. In an interview with Bill Maher, Stone claimed that he met President Bill Clinton at a private meeting at the White House in 1995, but that Clinton kept the visit off the official agenda due to Stone's controversial reputation.

Stone once suggested there might be a link between the September 11 attacks and the controversies of the 2000 election. He also reflected that the day the U.S. Supreme Court ended the Florida recount in the 2000 presidential election was "the worst moment, for me, of this century," as he supported Al Gore and believes that George W. Bush was the worst president in U.S. history.

Stone endorsed Democratic candidate John Kerry in the 2004 presidential election.

In 2012, Stone endorsed Ron Paul for the Republican nomination for president, citing his support for a non-interventionist foreign policy. He later clarified that he only supported Ron Paul in the Republican primary, but would not vote for him in the general election due to his domestic policy stances. According to Entertainment Weekly, Stone voted for Barack Obama as President of the United States in both the 2008 and 2012 elections. He praised Obama for his intelligence and calm handling of crises. However, at the 2017 San Sebastián film festival, Stone added that many Americans had become disillusioned with Obama's foreign policy, having originally thought he would be "a man of great integrity" but instead became disappointed that Obama continued many aspects of the Bush-era policy and created a massive global security surveillance state.

In March 2016, Stone wrote on The Huffington Post of his support for Vermont U.S. Senator Bernie Sanders for the 2016 Democratic nomination. After Sanders failed to secure the nomination, Stone voted for Green Party candidate Jill Stein for president. He added that, as a progressive leftist, he felt forced to vote third party, as he believed neoconservatives like Hillary Clinton had taken over the Democratic Party.

In April 2018, Stone attended a press conference at the Fajr Film Festival in Tehran, where he likened President Donald Trump to Beelzebub, the biblical demonic figure. Although Stone voted for Joe Biden in 2020, he criticized what he perceived to be the hypocrisy of the Democratic Party. Stone argued that the Democrats were not as concerned about Russian electoral interference as they had been in 2016 when Trump won and also feared that neoconservatives would ultimately control Biden. Conversely, Stone detailed 11 reasons why he could never vote for Trump (whom he had known socially prior to the presidency), including Trump's policies on Israel, Cuba and Venezuela, the assassination of Qasem Soleimani and his pardons of three court-martialed U.S. military officers who were accused or convicted of war crimes in Iraq and Afghanistan. He additionally cited Trump's stances on climate change and immigration.

On November 22, 2021, Stone penned an op-ed in The Hollywood Reporter criticizing both Trump and Biden for not declassifying all records on the assassination of John F. Kennedy. In July 2023, during an interview with Russell Brand, Stone said that he regretted voting for Biden because he feared that Biden could start World War III over the Russo-Ukrainian war. Also in 2023, Stone donated to his personal friend Robert F. Kennedy Jr.'s campaign for the 2024 Democratic presidential nomination. In the 2024 general presidential election, Stone again voted for Kennedy who, having failed to secure the Democratic nomination, appeared on the ballot as the American Independent Party candidate.

In response to Trump's 2025 executive order to release the final three percent of the investigative files related to the John F. Kennedy assassination, Stone wrote that Trump deserved praise, especially for also ordering the release of still classified files on the assassinations of Martin Luther King Jr. and Robert Kennedy. However, Stone noted that the files should have been originally released in October 2017, and cautioned that he supported the proposed oversight committee. On April 1, 2025, Stone testified before the House Oversight subcommittee on federal compliance with the JFK Records Act, having previously testified in April 1992 to support the legislation, which had been inspired by his film JFK. In his statement to the committee, he urged Congress "in good faith, outside all political considerations," to re-open the investigation of Kennedy's assassination.

=== Holocaust controversy ===
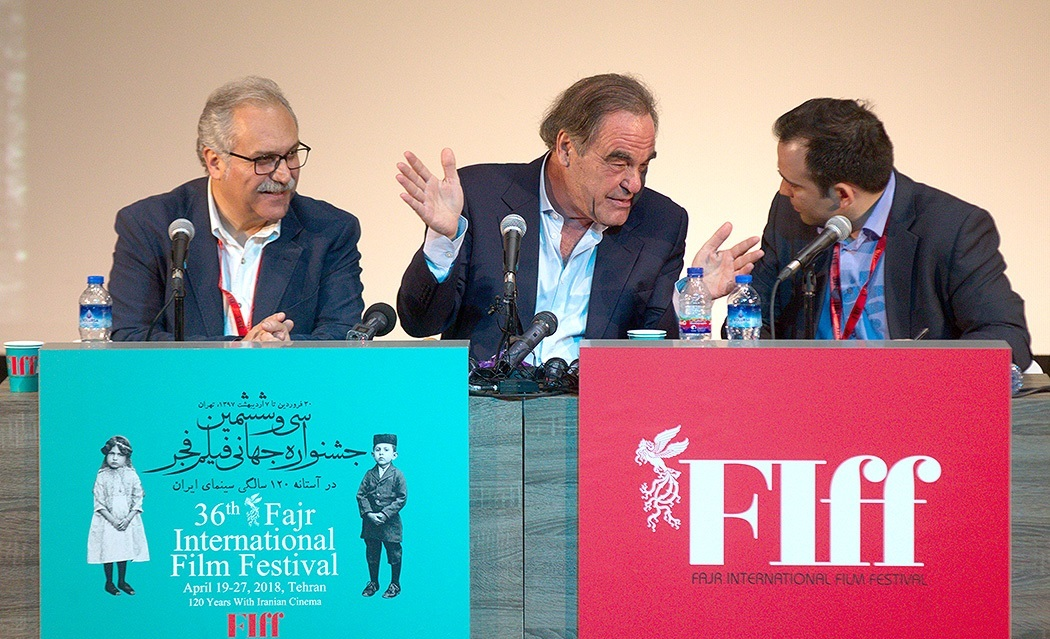
Oliver Stone in Tehran. 2018 Fajr International Film Festival

In a January 2010 press conference announcing his documentary series on the history of the United States, Stone commented that historians were too focused on Adolf Hitler as a single bad actor, and not focused enough on his collaborators and the context which allowed him to come to power. Those remarks drew controversy, with Rabbi Marvin Hier of the Simon Wiesenthal Center arguing that trying to put Hitler in context was akin to trying to explain cancer.

Interviewed by The Sunday Times later that year, Stone said that more Russians died in World War II than European Jews, and stated that ignoring Russian losses was an example of a Cold War-centric view of history. He objected to what he termed "the Jewish domination of the media," appearing to be critical of the coverage of the Holocaust by adding that Israel had an outsized influence on United States foreign policy. The remarks were criticized by Jewish groups, including the American Jewish Committee, which compared his comments negatively to those of Mel Gibson. Abraham Foxman of the Anti-Defamation League (ADL) criticized Stone's remarks about Jewish domination of the media and influence over U.S. foreign policy which, according to Foxman, echoed harmful stereotypes about Jewish power and control.

A day later, Stone replied:

In trying to make a broader historical point about the range of atrocities the Germans committed against many people, I made a clumsy association about the Holocaust, for which I am sorry and I regret. Jews obviously do not control media or any other industry. The fact that the Holocaust is still a very important, vivid and current matter today is, in fact, a great credit to the very hard work of a broad coalition of people committed to the remembrance of this atrocity—and it was an atrocity.

Two days later, Stone issued a second apology to the ADL, which was accepted. Foxman stated that the apology was thoughtful and productive and put an end to the matter.

=== WikiLeaks ===
Oliver Stone is a vocal supporter of WikiLeaks founder Julian Assange. In June 2012 Stone signed a petition backing Assange's bid for political asylum. The following August, he co-authored an op-ed in The New York Times with filmmaker Michael Moore, underscoring the importance of WikiLeaks and the broader implications for free speech. In April 2013, he visited Assange at the Ecuadorian Embassy in London, stating that most Americans underestimate the significance of Assange's work. He also criticized the documentary We Steal Secrets: The Story of WikiLeaks and the film The Fifth Estate, arguing that Assange was being unfairly targeted despite his contributions to press freedom.

In June 2013, Stone and numerous other celebrities appeared in a video showing support for Chelsea Manning.

=== Foreign policy ===
==== Latin America ====
Stone has had an interest in Latin America since the 1980s, when he directed Salvador, and later returned to make his documentary South of the Border about the left-leaning movements that had been taking hold in the region. He expressed the view that those movements were a positive step toward political and economic autonomy for the region. He supported Venezuelan president Hugo Chávez and admired the Colombian militant group FARC. Stone skipped the 68th Academy Awards ceremony, where his film Nixon received four nominations, to visit the Zapatistas of southern Mexico. Joking that he had no Oscar statuettes to give, guerrilla leader Subcomandante Marcos presented Stone with a tobacco pipe instead.

Stone has also criticized the U.S.-supported Operation Condor, a state terror operation that carried out assassinations and disappearances in support of South America's right-wing dictatorships in Argentina (see Dirty War), Bolivia, Brazil, Chile, Paraguay, and Uruguay.

==== Russia ====
In the early 1980s, Stone visited the Soviet Union for the first time to interview anti-Communist dissidents as research for a screenplay. He also used the trip to covertly smuggle Western goods into the USSR on behalf of a French human rights organization. His activities eventually drew the attention of Soviet authorities and he was briefly detained in Tbilisi, Georgia before being allowed to leave the country. The resulting screenplay, Defiance, was never made.

In December 2014, Stone made statements supporting the Russian government's narrative on Ukraine, portraying the 2014 Ukrainian Revolution of Dignity as a CIA plot. He also rejected the claim that former Ukrainian president Viktor Yanukovych (overthrown as a result of that revolution) was responsible for the killing of protesters, and that Yanukovych was the legitimate president forced to leave Ukraine by "well-armed, neo-Nazi radicals." He added that the United States was interfering in the domestic policy of Ukraine.

Following the 2022 Russian invasion of Ukraine, Stone wrote, "Although the United States has many wars of aggression on its conscience, it doesn't justify Mr. Putin's aggression in Ukraine. A dozen wrongs don't make a right. Russia was wrong to invade," an opinion he reiterated in March 2025. He also continued to blame the source of the conflict on the U.S. and NATO, emphasizing his fear of a potential nuclear war and accusing the U.S. of seeking to dominate the world. In a May 2023 interview discussing Nuclear Now, Stone declined to comment on Russia's foreign policy, but praised the country (along with China) as a leader in nuclear energy, and added that Putin was a great leader for his country who had support from his citizens.

In a June 2017 interview with The Nation to promote his documentary on Vladimir Putin, Stone rejected the narrative of the United States' intelligence agencies that Russia sought to influence the 2016 presidential election. Stone accused the CIA, FBI, and NSA of cooking the intelligence. He added that the Israeli lobby AIPAC and billionaires such as Sheldon Adelson and the Koch brothers had more influence on American elections than Russia.

Russia passed a law in 2013 banning alleged "gay propaganda" to minors, which has been criticized as being used for a crackdown on LGBTQ support. In a 2019 interview with Putin, Stone commented that the law might be sensible, but later denied being homophobic. During the COVID pandemic, Stone took the Sputnik V vaccine for the COVID-19 virus while filming a documentary in Russia and the Pfizer vaccine upon his return to the United States, calling himself "a pin cushion for American–Russian peace relations."

==== Middle East ====
Stone has called Saudi Arabia a major destabilizer in the Middle East. He also criticized the foreign policy of the United States, condemning the U.S. role in conflicts across Iraq, Syria, and Libya, and expressing frustration that the American public appears indifferent to the region's ongoing turmoil caused by those interventions. Stone has also been critical of Israel's foreign policy, particularly during the leadership of Benjamin Netanyahu, whom he has interviewed. In March 2002, Stone was filming a documentary in the West Bank when Operation Defensive Shield was launched. He and his crew were forced to flee Ramallah with assistance from the Canadian government. Since the start of the Israel–Gaza war, Stone has been outspoken against Israeli war crimes and has alleged that Hollywood "destroys" those in the entertainment industry who take a pro-Palestinian stance.

In his foreword to the 2025 book Syria: Anatomy of Regime Change, Stone argued that U.S. policy in the Middle East reflects a neo‑colonial approach that undermines local cultures and severely harms civilian populations. He also predicted that those aggressive policies would ultimately lead to war with Iran.

== Filmography ==
=== Film ===
Year	Title	Director	Writer	Producer	Notes
1974	Seizure	Yes	Yes	No	
1978	Midnight Express	No	Yes	No	
1981	The Hand	Yes	Yes	No	
1982	Conan the Barbarian	No	Yes	No	
1983	Scarface	No	Yes	No	
1985	Year of the Dragon	No	Yes	No	
1986	Salvador	Yes	Yes	Yes	
1986	8 Million Ways to Die	No	Yes	No	
1986	Platoon	Yes	Yes	No	Inducted into the National Film Registry in 2019
1987	Wall Street	Yes	Yes	No	
1988	Talk Radio	Yes	Yes	No	
1989	Born on the Fourth of July	Yes	Yes	Yes	
1991	The Doors	Yes	Yes	No	Also soundtrack album director
1991	JFK	Yes	Yes	Yes	Also soundtrack album director
1993	Heaven & Earth	Yes	Yes	Yes	Also soundtrack album director
1994	Natural Born Killers	Yes	Yes	Executive	Also soundtrack album director
1995	Nixon	Yes	Yes	Yes	
1996	Evita	No	Yes	No	
1997	U Turn	Yes	Uncredited	No	
1999	Any Given Sunday	Yes	Yes	Executive	
2004	Alexander	Yes	Yes	No	
2006	World Trade Center	Yes	No	No	
2008	W.	Yes	No	No	
2010	Wall Street: Money Never Sleeps	Yes	No	Uncredited	
2012	Savages	Yes	Yes	No	
2016	Snowden	Yes	Yes	No	
TBA	White Lies	Yes	Yes	No	Post-production

Executive producer

- Zebrahead (1992)
- South Central (1992)
- The Joy Luck Club (1993)
- The New Age (1994)
- Killer: A Journal of Murder (1995)
- Freeway (1996)
- The People vs. Larry Flynt (1996)
- Cold Around the Heart (1997)
- The Corruptor (1999)

Producer only

- Blue Steel (1990)
- Reversal of Fortune (1990)
- Savior (1998)

Other credits

Year	Title	Role
1973	Sugar Cookies	Associate producer
1996	Gravesend	Presenter

=== Television ===
Executive producer

- Wild Palms (1993)
- Indictment: The McMartin Trial (1995) (TV movie)
- The Day Reagan Was Shot (2001) (TV movie)

=== Documentary works ===
Film

Year	Title	Director	Writer	Executive producer	Notes
1998	The Last Days of Kennedy and King	No	No	Yes	
2003	Comandante	Yes	Yes	No	Also narrator
2009	South of the Border	Yes	No	No	
2012	Castro in Winter	Yes	No	No	
2014	Mi amigo Hugo	Yes	No	No	
2015	A Good American	No	No	Yes	
2016	Ukraine on Fire	No	No	Yes	
2016	All Governments Lie	No	No	Yes	
2019	Revealing Ukraine	No	No	Yes	
2021	JFK Revisited: Through the Looking Glass	Yes	Yes	No	
2021	Qazaq: History of the Golden Man	No	No	Yes	
2022	Nuclear Now	Yes	Yes	No	
2024	Lula	Yes	No	No	

TV series

Year	Title	Director	Writer	Producer	Notes
2003–2004	America Undercover	Yes	Yes	No	Episodes Looking for Fidel and Persona Non Grata
2012–2013	The Untold History of the United States	Yes	Yes	Executive	
2017	The Putin Interviews	Yes	Yes	Yes	
2021	JFK: Destiny Betrayed	Yes	No	No	

== Accolades and honors ==
Accolades received by Stone's film
Year	Title	Academy Awards		BAFTA Awards		Golden Globe Awards	
Year	Title	Nominations	Wins	Nominations	Wins	Nominations	Wins
1986	Salvador	2					
1986	Platoon	8	4	3	2	4	3
1987	Wall Street	1	1			1	1
1989	Born on the Fourth of July	8	2	2		5	4
1991	JFK	8	2	4	2	4	1
1993	Heaven & Earth					1	1
1994	Natural Born Killers					1	
1995	Nixon	4		1		1	
2010	Wall Street: Money Never Sleeps					1	
Total		31	9	10	4	18	10

Directed Academy Award performances
Under Stone's direction, these actors have received Academy Award nominations (and one win) for their performances in their respective roles.

Year	Performer	Film	Result
Academy Award for Best Actor
1986	James Woods	Salvador	Nominated
1987	Michael Douglas	Wall Street	Won
1989	Tom Cruise	Born on the Fourth of July	Nominated
1995	Anthony Hopkins	Nixon	Nominated
Academy Award for Best Supporting Actor
1986	Tom Berenger	Platoon	Nominated
1986	Willem Dafoe	Platoon	Nominated
1991	Tommy Lee Jones	JFK	Nominated
Academy Award for Best Supporting Actress
1995	Joan Allen	Nixon	Nominated

Honors

- Commander of the Order of Intellectual Merit (Morocco, 2003)
- 2007: Lifetime Achievement Award of Zurich Film Festival
- On July 4, 2024, Stone was awarded the rank of Commander of the Order of Arts and Letters, the highest civilian honor in France, for cultural contributions to both the country and the film industry. He was previously awarded the rank of Chevalier in 1992.

== Bibliography ==
=== Books ===
- Oliver Stone's Platoon & Salvador. Co-authored with Richard Boyle. New York: Vintage Books, 1987. ISBN 978-0394756295. 254 pages.
- JFK: The Book of the Film: The Documented Screenplay. Co-authored with Zachary Sklar. Hal Leonard Corporation, 1992. ISBN 978-1557831279.
- A Child's Night Dream: A Novel. New York: Macmillan, 1998. ISBN 978-0312194468.
- Oliver Stone: Interviews. University Press of Mississippi, 2001. ISBN 978-1578063031.
- Last Word: My Indictment of the CIA in the Murder of JFK. Co-authored with Mark Lane & Robert K. Tanenbaum. New York: Skyhorse Publishing, 2012. ISBN 978-1620870709.
- The Untold History of the United States. Co-authored by Peter Kuznick. New York: Simon & Schuster, 2012. ISBN 978-1451613513.
- The Putin Interviews. New York: Skyhorse Publishing, 2017. ISBN 978-1510733435.
- Chasing the Light: Writing, Directing, and Surviving Platoon, Midnight Express, Scarface, Salvador, and the Movie Game (July 2020)

=== Introductions or forewords ===
- Introduction to Prouty, L. Fletcher (1992). JFK: The CIA, Vietnam, and the Plot to Assassinate John F. Kennedy. Birch Lane Press. ISBN 978-1559721301.
- Foreword to Sloan, Bill (2008). JFK: The Last Dissenting Witness. Pelican Publishing. ISBN 978-1455606702.
- Foreword to DiEugenio, James (2016). Reclaiming Parkland: Tom Hanks, Vincent Bugliosi, and the JFK Assassination in the New Hollywood (revised and expanded ed.). Skyhorse Publishing. ISBN 978-1510707764.
- Foreword to DiEugenio, James (2018). The JFK Assassination. Skyhorse Publishing. ISBN 978-1510739840.
- Foreword to Kovalik, Dan (2019). The Plot to Overthrow Venezuela: How the US Is Orchestrating a Coup for Oil. Hot Books. ISBN 978-1510750739.
- Introduction to Poulgrain, Greg (2020). JFK vs. Allen Dulles: Battleground Indonesia. Skyhorse Publishing. ISBN 978-1510744806.

=== Interviews ===
- Crowdus, Gary. "Clarifying the Conspiracy: An Interview with Oliver Stone". Cinéaste, Vol. 19, No. 1, 1992. pp. 25–27. JSTOR 41688064.
- Long, Camilla. "Oliver Stone: Lobbing Grenades in All Directions". Archived from the original. The Sunday Times, July 25, 2010.
- Theroux, Louis (January 4, 2021). "The Untold History of the United States". Grounded. BBC Radio 4. (Omits mention of: Stone's support for whistleblower Julian Assange; "JFK")

=== Screenplays ===
- Snowden: Official Motion Picture Edition. Co-authored with Kieran Fitzgerald. Skyhorse Publishing, 2016. ISBN 978-1510719712.
