= James W. Douglass =

American peace activist, and Catholic theologian (born 1937)

- Born: 1937 (age 88–89)
- Education: Santa Clara University; Notre Dame University
- Occupations: Teacher; Author; Peace activist; Catholic theologian
- Notable work: JFK and the Unspeakable (2008)
- Spouse: Shelley Douglass
- Children: 1; Thomas Douglass
- Awards: Pacem in Terris Award (1997)

James W. "Jim" Douglass (born 1937) is an American peace activist, Catholic theologian, teacher, and author. From 1968 to 1991, he wrote multiple books on the theology of nonviolence. He and his wife Shelley founded the Ground Zero Center for Nonviolent Action in Poulsbo, Washington, and Mary's House, a Catholic Worker house in Birmingham, Alabama. In 1997, the couple received the Pacem in Terris Award. Douglass is best known for his 2008 book, JFK and the Unspeakable.

== Peace activism ==
After earning a bachelor's degree in English and philosophy from Santa Clara University, and a master's degree in theology from Notre Dame University, Douglass enrolled in Gregorian University in Rome during the Second Vatican Council. He served as an unofficial adviser to Catholic bishops on issues of war and peace.

In 1965, Douglass was hired to teach theology at Bellarmine College in Louisville, Kentucky. It was there that he met and was influenced by the Trappist monk Thomas Merton, author of Raids on the Unspeakable (1966). Douglass then taught at Notre Dame University and the University of Hawaii. At the latter school, he engaged in his first acts of civil disobedience while protesting against the Vietnam War. Starting in 1968 with his book The Non-Violent Cross: A Theology of Revolution and Peace, he published a series of works on the theology of nonviolence. He stopped teaching in 1972 to become a full-time author and peace activist.

In 1977, Douglass and his wife Shelley helped found the Ground Zero Center for Nonviolent Action, which attempted to block the installation of a Trident missile nuclear submarine base on the Kitsap Peninsula in Washington state. The Douglasses, along with other activists, formed a small intentional community, the Pacific Life Community, near the submarine base. Their goal was:

to "seek the truth of a nonviolent way of life", both personally and politically. Personally we tried to confront our racism, sexism, consumerism — all the isms that allowed us to violate others. Politically, we chose to experiment with nonviolent actions resisting Trident, a system that seemed to epitomize all the violence of our society.

While working with the Ground Zero Center, the Douglasses developed the Tracks campaign, which protested against the White Train that transported nuclear missile parts to Bangor Trident Base. Their nonviolent actions to impede the White Train resulted in both Douglass and his wife spending months in jail for civil disobedience.

The Douglasses later moved to the Ensley neighborhood of Birmingham, Alabama, to establish Mary's House, a "house of hospitality" for homeless and indigent people in the city.

Douglass has traveled to the Middle East on peace missions. In 2003 he joined a Christian Peacemaker Team in Iraq and stayed with civilians during the U.S.-led invasion.

Douglass is a member and co-founder of Religious Leaders for 9/11 Truth, an organization that questions the "official story" about the 9/11 attacks.

In 2006, publisher Wipf & Stock reissued four early books by Douglass on nonviolence.

== Assassination research ==
As a correspondent for Probe magazine, Douglass covered the 1999 Loyd Jowers civil trial in Memphis, and wrote about the proceedings. The wrongful death lawsuit, filed by the family of Martin Luther King Jr., alleged that the MLK assassination was carried out by "Loyd Jowers and other unknown co-conspirators". In the course of his assassination research, Douglass obtained the first public interview of ex-FBI agent Donald Wilson—he claimed to have found documents in James Earl Ray's car that pointed to a conspiracy in King's death. Wilson shared the documents with the King family, who then used them as evidence in their lawsuit. The U.S. DOJ disputed Wilson's story and the authenticity of the documents. Douglass has also written about the assassination of Malcolm X.

Douglass's book about the JFK assassination, JFK and the Unspeakable, released in 2008 by Catholic publishing house Orbis Books, is his most commercially successful work. After receiving favorable publicity on TV, the book briefly entered Amazon.com's Top 100. Douglass's thesis is that the JFK assassination was a conspiracy, ordered by unknown parties and carried out by the CIA with help from the Mafia and elements in the FBI, to halt President Kennedy's efforts to end the Cold War in the aftermath of the Cuban Missile Crisis. Touchstone Books, a former Simon & Schuster imprint, issued a paperback version in 2010.

== Published works ==
- The Non-Violent Cross: A Theology of Revolution and Peace. London: G. Chapman (1968). OCLC 1599938165.
- "The Human Revolution: A Search for Wholeness". In O'Gorman, Ned (ed.). Prophetic Voices: Ideas and Words on Revolution. New York: Random House (1969). OCLC 9865.
- Resistance and Contemplation: The Way of Liberation. Garden City, New York: Doubleday (1972). LCCN 78-175368.
- Lightning East to West: Jesus, Gandhi, and the Nuclear Age. New York: Crossroad (1983). ISBN 978-0824505875.
- Dear Gandhi: Now What? Letters from Ground Zero. Philadelphia: New Society Publishers (1988). ISBN 978-0865711259. Written with Shelley Douglass. Illustrations by Bill Livermore.
- The Nonviolent Coming of God. Maryknoll, New York: Orbis Books (1991). ISBN 978-1597526111.
- Selections from the Writings of Shelley and Jim Douglass, with Mary Evelyn Jegen. Erie, Pennsylvania: Pax Christi USA (1991). OCLC 34667609.
- Compassion and the Unspeakable. Lanett, Alabama: Project Hope (1998). OCLC 46786565. This pamphlet reprints Douglass's keynote address at a conference of the International Thomas Merton Society, held in Mobile, Alabama on June 13, 1997.
- "The Assassinations of Martin Luther King and John F. Kennedy in the Light of the Fourth Gospel". Sewanee Theological Review. 42 (1). December 1998. OCLC 48909696. This journal article reprints a lecture that Douglass gave at Seattle University on January 20, 1998.
- "The Martin Luther King Conspiracy Exposed in Memphis". In Pease, Lisa; DiEugenio, James (eds.). The Assassinations: Probe Magazine on JFK, MLK, RFK and Malcolm X. Feral House (2003). pp. 492–509. ISBN 978-0922915828.
- "The Murder and Martyrdom of Malcolm X". In Pease, Lisa; DiEugenio, James (eds.). The Assassinations: Probe Magazine on JFK, MLK, RFK and Malcolm X. Feral House (2003). pp. 376–424. ISBN 978-0922915828.
- "Interview with Donald Wilson". In Pease, Lisa; DiEugenio, James (eds.). The Assassinations: Probe Magazine on JFK, MLK, RFK and Malcolm X. Feral House (2003). pp. 479–491.
- A Question of Being: The Integration of Resistance and Contemplation in James Douglass's Theology of Nonviolence, with Karen Holsinger Sherman. Eugene, Oregon: Wipf & Stock (2007). ISBN 978-1498249188.
- JFK and the Unspeakable: Why He Died and Why It Matters. Maryknoll, New York: Orbis Books (2008). ISBN 978-1570757556.
- Gandhi and the Unspeakable: His Final Experiment with Truth. Maryknoll, New York: Orbis Books (2012). ISBN 978-1570759635.
- Martyrs to the Unspeakable: The Assassinations of JFK, Malcolm, Martin, and RFK. Maryknoll, New York: Orbis Books (2025). ISBN 978-1626986268.
