= CIA Kennedy assassination conspiracy theory =

JFK assassination conspiracy theory

The CIA Kennedy assassination conspiracy theory is a prominent John F. Kennedy assassination conspiracy theory. According to ABC News, the Central Intelligence Agency (CIA) is represented in nearly every theory that involves American conspirators. The secretive nature of the CIA, and the conjecture surrounding the high-profile political assassinations in the United States during the 1960s, has made the CIA a plausible suspect for some who believe in a conspiracy. Conspiracy theorists have ascribed various motives for CIA involvement in the assassination of President Kennedy, including Kennedy's firing of CIA director Allen Dulles, Kennedy's refusal to provide air support to the Bay of Pigs invasion, Kennedy's plan to cut the agency's budget by 20 percent, and the belief that the president was weak on communism. In 1979, the House Select Committee on Assassinations (HSCA) concluded that the CIA was not involved in the assassination of Kennedy.

== Background ==
John F. Kennedy, the 35th President of the United States, was assassinated in Dallas, Texas, on November 22, 1963. Lee Harvey Oswald was charged with the killings of Kennedy and Dallas policeman J. D. Tippit but was murdered by nightclub owner Jack Ruby two days later.

In 1964, the Warren Commission concluded that Oswald killed Kennedy and Tippit, and that there was no evidence that Oswald was part of a conspiracy. However, the discrepancies between the official investigations and the extraordinary nature of the assassination have led to a variety of theories about how and why Kennedy was assassinated, as well as the possibility of a conspiracy. In 1979, the House Select Committee on Assassinations (HSCA) agreed that Oswald killed Kennedy, but concluded that a second gunman probably also fired at Kennedy and that a conspiracy was probable. The committee's conclusion of a conspiracy was based almost entirely on the results of a forensic analysis of a police dictabelt recording, which was later disputed.

== Origin and history ==
In 1966, New Orleans District Attorney Jim Garrison began an investigation into the assassination of President Kennedy. Garrison's investigation led him to conclude that a group of right-wing extremists were involved with elements of the Central Intelligence Agency (CIA) in a conspiracy to kill Kennedy. Garrison also came to believe that businessman Clay Shaw, head of the International Trade Mart in New Orleans, was part of the conspiracy. On March 1, 1967, Garrison arrested and charged Shaw with conspiring to assassinate President Kennedy.

Three days after Shaw's arrest, the Italian left-wing newspaper Paese Sera published an article alleging that Shaw was linked to the CIA through his involvement in the Centro Mondiale Commerciale (CMC), a subsidiary of the trade organization Permindex in which Shaw was a board member. According to Paese Sera, the CMC had been a front organization developed by the CIA for transferring funds to Italy for "illegal political-espionage activities." Paese Sera also reported that the CMC had attempted to depose French President Charles de Gaulle in the early 1960s. The newspaper printed other allegations about individuals it said were connected to Permindex, including Louis Bloomfield whom it described as "an American agent who now plays the role of a businessman from Canada [who] established secret ties in Rome with Deputies of the Christian Democrats and neo-Fascist parties."

The allegations were reprinted in various newspapers associated with the Communist parties in Italy (l'Unità), France (L'Humanité), and the Soviet Union (Pravda), as well as leftist newspapers in Canada and Greece, prior to reaching the American press eight weeks later. American journalist Max Holland wrote that the KGB planted the original story in Paese Sera, citing archives released by Vasili Mitrokhin, thereby influencing both Garrison's subsequent accusations against the CIA and Oliver Stone's 1991 film JFK. In 1969, Shaw was brought to trial on charges of conspiring to assassinate Kennedy, and the jury found him not guilty.

The CIA has rejected allegations of involvement and has sought to counter these allegations. A declassified CIA cable sent to CIA overseas stations and bases in 1967 encourages agents to not discuss the assassination unless such a discussion is already occurring. The CIA cable further suggests that agents should “discuss the publicity problem with liaison and friendly elite contacts, especially politicians and editors” and “employ propaganda assets to answer and refute the attacks of the critics”. It highlights book reviews and feature articles as one method of refutation and encourages making the claim that “parts of the conspiracy talk appear to be deliberately generated by Communist propagandists”.

== Proponents and believers ==
Jim Garrison alleged that anti-Communist and anti-Castro extremists in the CIA plotted the assassination of Kennedy to maintain tension with the Soviet Union and Cuba, and to prevent a United States withdrawal from Vietnam. James Douglass wrote in JFK and the Unspeakable that the CIA, acting upon the orders of conspirators with the "military industrial complex", killed Kennedy and in the process set up Lee Harvey Oswald as a fall guy. Like Garrison, Douglass stated that Kennedy was killed because he was turning away from the Cold War and pursuing paths of nuclear disarmament, rapprochement with Fidel Castro, and withdrawal from the war in Vietnam. Mark Lane — author of Rush to Judgment and Plausible Denial and the attorney who defended Liberty Lobby against a defamation suit brought by former CIA agent E. Howard Hunt — has been described as a leading proponent of the theory that the CIA was responsible for the assassination of Kennedy. Others who believe the CIA was involved include authors Anthony Summers and John M. Newman.

In 1977, the FBI released 40,000 files pertaining to the assassination of Kennedy, including an April 3, 1967, memorandum from Deputy Director Cartha DeLoach to Associate Director Clyde Tolson that was written less than a month after President Johnson learned from J. Edgar Hoover about CIA plots to kill Fidel Castro. According to DeLoach, LBJ aide Marvin Watson "stated that the President had told him, in an off moment, that he was now convinced there was a plot in connection with the assassination [of President Kennedy]. Watson stated the President felt that [the] CIA had had something to do with this plot." When questioned in 1975, during the Church Committee hearings, DeLoach told Senator Richard Schweiker that he "felt [that Watson's statement was] sheer speculation." (Note: According to Kathryn S. Olmsted in Real Enemies: Conspiracy Theories and American Democracy, World War I to 9/11: "For his part, Lyndon Johnson was convinced that the Castro plots had led to Kennedy's assassination. Before his death in 1973, he told many people — his friends, his publisher, and at least four reporters — that he believed that Castro had organized a successful conspiracy to kill Kennedy.")

== Conspirators and evidence ==
=== Oswald impersonator in Mexico City conspiracy theory ===
Gaeton Fonzi was hired as a researcher in 1975 by the Church Committee and by the House of Representatives Select Committee on Assassinations (HSCA) in 1977. At the HSCA, Fonzi focused on the anti-Castro Cuban exile groups, and the links that these groups had with the CIA and the Mafia. Fonzi obtained testimony from Cuban exile Antonio Veciana that Veciana had once witnessed his CIA contact, who Fonzi would later come to believe was David Atlee Phillips, conferring with Lee Harvey Oswald. Through his research, Fonzi became convinced that Phillips had played a key role in the assassination of President Kennedy. Fonzi also concluded that, as part of the assassination plot, Phillips had actively worked to embellish Oswald's image as a communist sympathizer. He further concluded that the presence of a possible Oswald impersonator in Mexico City, during the period that Oswald himself was in Mexico City, may have been orchestrated by Phillips

This evidence first surfaced in testimony given to the HSCA in 1978, and through the investigative work of independent journalist Anthony Summers in 1979. Summers spoke with a man named Oscar Contreras, a law student at National University in Mexico City, who said that someone calling himself Lee Harvey Oswald struck up a conversation with him inside a university cafeteria, in the fall of 1963. The Warren Commission concluded that Oswald had taken a bus trip from Houston to Mexico City and back during September–October 1963. Contreras described "Oswald" as "over thirty, light-haired and fairly short" — a description that did not fit the real Oswald To Fonzi, it seemed improbable that the real Oswald would at random start a conversation regarding his difficulties in obtaining a Cuban visa with Contreras, a man who belonged to a pro-Castro student group and had contacts in the Cuban embassy in Mexico City.

Fonzi theorized that there was an Oswald impersonator in Mexico City, directed by Phillips, during the period that the Warren Commission concluded that Oswald himself had visited the city. Fonzi's belief was strengthened by statements from other witnesses. On September 27, 1963, and again a week later, a man identifying himself as Oswald visited the Cuban embassy in Mexico City. Consular Eusebio Azcue told Anthony Summers that the real Oswald "in no way resembled" the "Oswald" to whom he had spoken to at length. Embassy employee Sylvia Duran also told Summers that the real Oswald she eventually saw on film "is not like the man I saw here in Mexico City."

On October 1, the CIA recorded two tapped telephone calls to the Soviet embassy by a man identified as Oswald. The CIA transcriber noted that "Oswald" spoke in "broken Russian". The real Oswald was quite fluent in Russian. On October 10, 1963, the CIA issued a teletype to the FBI, the State Department and the Navy, regarding Oswald's visits to Mexico City. The teletype was accompanied by a photo of a man identified as Oswald who in fact looked nothing like him.

On November 23, 1963, the day after the assassination of President Kennedy, FBI Director J. Edgar Hoover's preliminary analysis of the assassination included the following:

The Central Intelligence Agency advised that on October 1st, 1963, an extremely sensitive source had reported that an individual identifying himself as Lee Oswald contacted the Soviet Embassy in Mexico City inquiring as to any messages. Special agents of this Bureau, who have conversed with Oswald in Dallas, Texas, have observed photographs of the individual referred to above and have listened to a recording of his voice. These special agents are of the opinion that the referred-to individual was not Lee Harvey Oswald.

That same day, Hoover had this conversation with the new president, Lyndon Johnson:

JOHNSON: "Have you established any more about the [Oswald] visit to the Soviet Embassy in Mexico in September?"

HOOVER: "No, there's one angle that's very confusing for this reason. We have up here the tape and the photograph of the man at the Soviet Embassy, using Oswald's name. That picture and the tape do not correspond to this man's voice, nor to his appearance. In other words, it appears that there was a second person who was at the Soviet Embassy."

Fonzi concluded it was unlikely that the CIA would legitimately not be able to produce a single photograph of the real Oswald as part of the documentation of his trip to Mexico City, given that Oswald had made five separate visits to the Soviet and Cuban embassies (according to the Warren Commission) where the CIA maintained surveillance cameras.

=== Three tramps ===
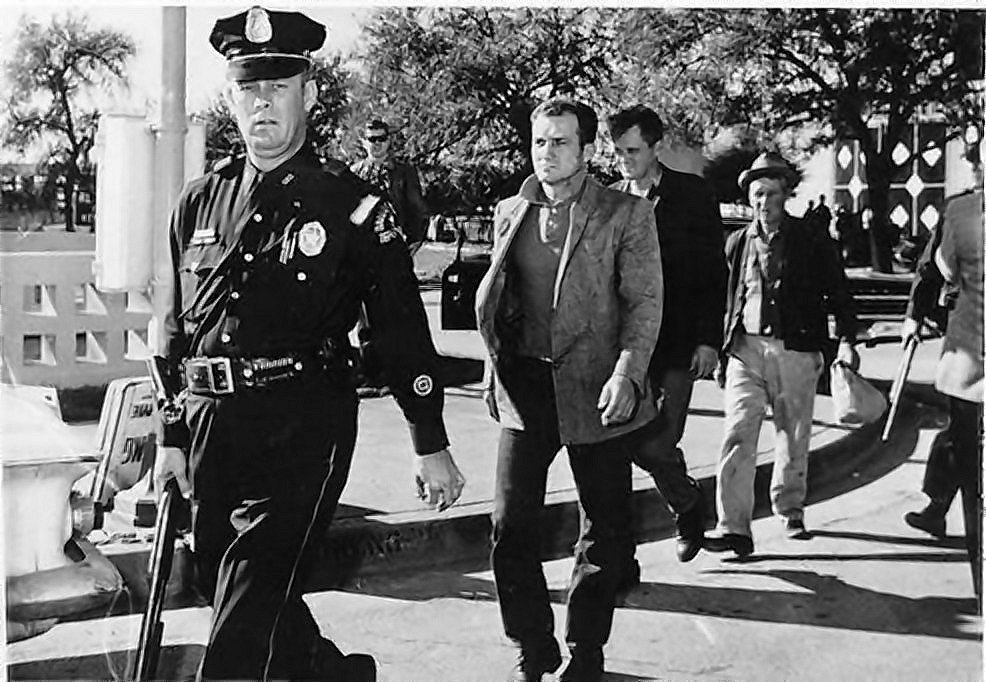
The three tramps

The "three tramps" are three men photographed by several Dallas newspapers under police escort near the Texas School Book Depository shortly after the assassination of President Kennedy. The men were detained and questioned briefly by the Dallas police. They have been the subject of various conspiracy theories, including some that allege the three men to be known CIA agents. Some of these allegations are listed below.

E. Howard Hunt is alleged by some to be the oldest of the tramps. Hunt was a CIA station chief in Mexico City and was involved in the Bay of Pigs Invasion. Hunt later worked as one of President Richard Nixon's White House Plumbers. Others believe that the oldest tramp is Chauncey Holt. Holt claimed to have been a double agent for the CIA and the Mafia, and claimed that his assignment in Dallas was to provide fake Secret Service credentials to people in the vicinity. Witness reports state that there were one or more unidentified men in the area claiming to be Secret Service agents. Both Dallas police officer Joe Smith and Army veteran Gordon Arnold have claimed to have met a man on or near the grassy knoll who showed them credentials identifying him as a Secret Service agent.

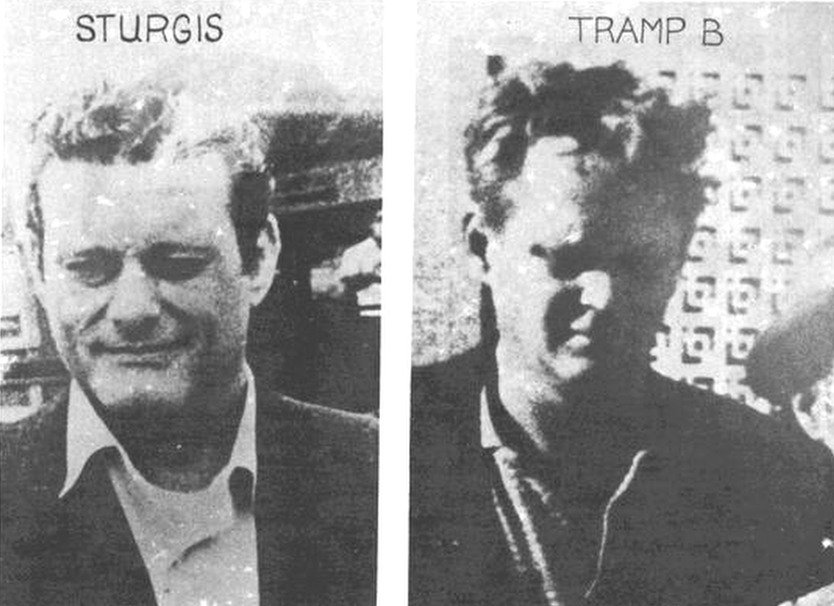
Frank Sturgis and one of the three tramps

Frank Sturgis is thought by some to be the tall tramp. Like E. Howard Hunt, Sturgis was involved both in the Bay of Pigs invasion and in the Watergate burglary. In 1959, Sturgis became involved with Marita Lorenz. Lorenz would later claim that Sturgis told her that he had participated in a JFK assassination plot. In response to her allegations, Sturgis denied being involved in a conspiracy to kill Kennedy. In an interview with Steve Dunleavy of the New York Post, Sturgis said that he believed communist agents had pressured Lorenz into making the accusations against him.

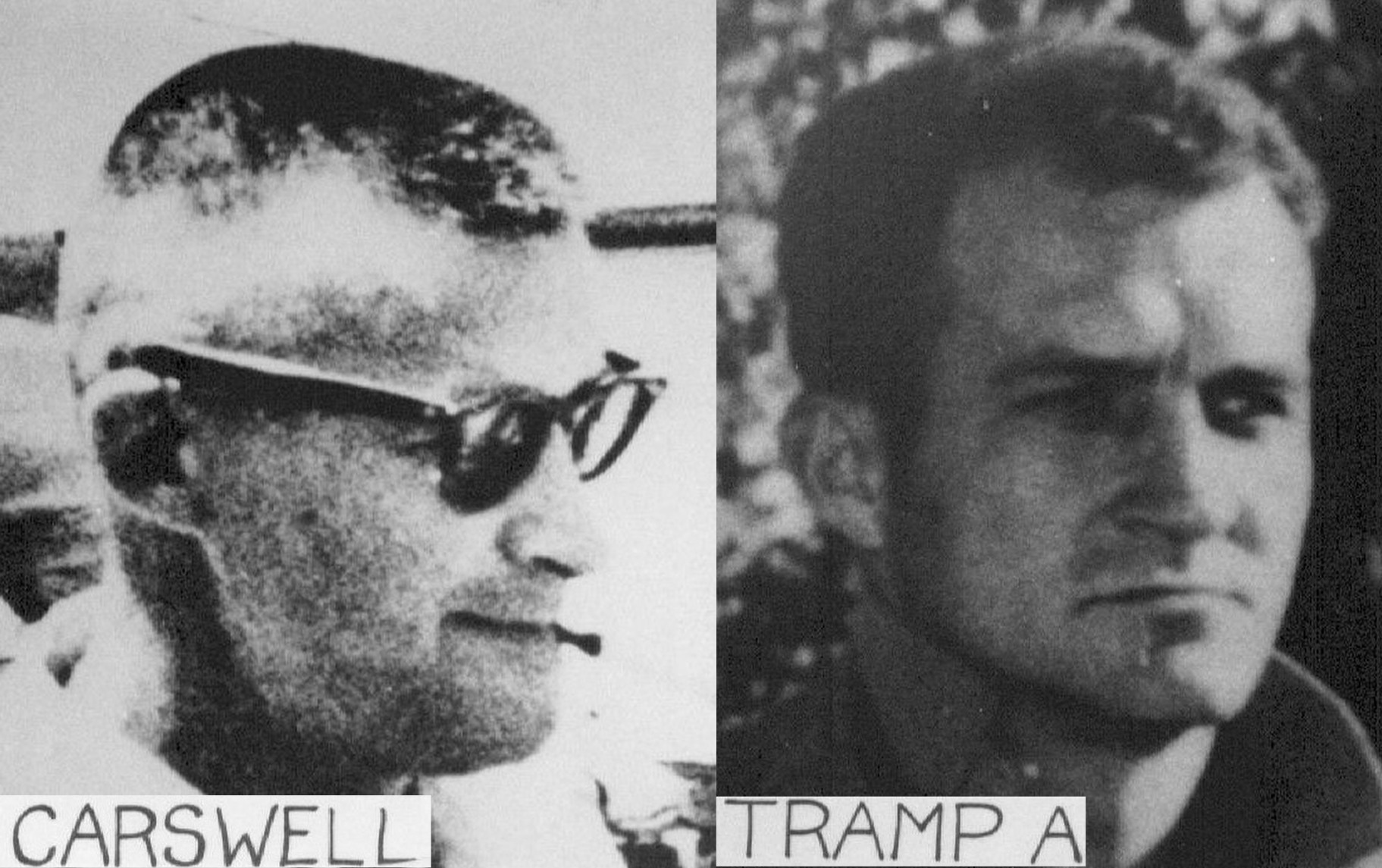
Carswell and one of the three tramps

The House Select Committee on Assassinations had forensic anthropologists study the photographic evidence. The committee claimed that its analysis ruled out E. Howard Hunt, Frank Sturgis, Dan Carswell, Fred Lee Chapman, and other suspects. The Rockefeller Commission concluded that neither Hunt nor Frank Sturgis were in Dallas on the day of the assassination. Records released by the Dallas Police Department in 1989 identified the three men as Gus Abrams, Harold Doyle, and John Gedney.

=== E. Howard Hunt ===
Several conspiracy theorists have named former CIA agent and Watergate figure E. Howard Hunt as a possible participant in the Kennedy assassination and some, as noted before, have alleged that Hunt is one of the three tramps. Hunt has taken various magazines to court over accusations with regard to the assassination.

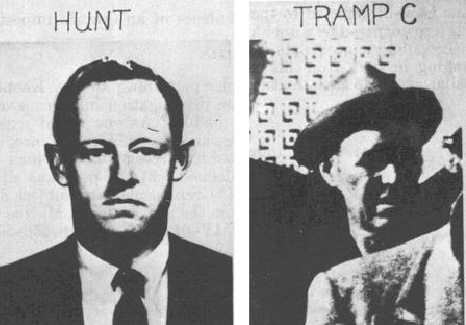
E. Howard Hunt and one of the three tramps arrested after JFK assassination

In 1975, Hunt testified before the United States President's Commission on CIA Activities within the United States that he was in Washington, D.C., on the day of the assassination. This testimony was confirmed by Hunt's family and a home employee of the Hunts.

In 1976, a magazine called The Spotlight ran an article accusing Hunt of being in Dallas on November 22, 1963, and of having a role in the assassination. Hunt won a libel judgment against the magazine in 1981, but this verdict was overturned on appeal. The magazine was found not liable when the case was retried in 1985. In 1985, Hunt was in court again in a libel suit against Liberty Lobby. During the trial, defense attorney Mark Lane was successful in creating doubt among the jury as to Hunt's location on the day of the Kennedy assassination through depositions from David Atlee Phillips, Richard Helms, G. Gordon Liddy, Stansfield Turner, and Marita Lorenz, as well as through his cross examination of Hunt.

In August 2003, while in failing health, Hunt allegedly confessed to his son of his knowledge of a conspiracy in the JFK assassination. However, Hunt's health improved and he went on to live four more years. Shortly before Hunt's death in 2007, he authored an autobiography which implicated Lyndon B. Johnson in the assassination, suggesting that Johnson had orchestrated the killing with the help of CIA agents who had been angered by Kennedy's actions as president. After Hunt's death, his sons, Saint John Hunt and David Hunt, stated that their father had recorded several claims about himself and others being involved in a conspiracy to assassinate President Kennedy.

In the April 5, 2007, issue of Rolling Stone, Saint John Hunt detailed a number of individuals purported to be implicated by his father, including Lyndon B. Johnson, Cord Meyer, David Phillips, Frank Sturgis, David Morales, Antonio Veciana, William Harvey, and an assassin he termed "French gunman grassy knoll" who some presume was Lucien Sarti. The two sons alleged that their father cut the information from his memoirs to avoid possible perjury charges. According to Hunt's widow and other children, the two sons took advantage of Hunt's loss of lucidity by coaching and exploiting him for financial gain. The Los Angeles Times said they examined the materials offered by the sons to support the story and found them to be "inconclusive".

=== David Sánchez Morales ===
Some researchers—among them Gaeton Fonzi, Larry Hancock, Noel Twyman, and John Simkin—believe that CIA operative David Morales was involved in the Kennedy assassination. Morales' friend, Ruben Carbajal, claimed that in 1973 Morales opened up about his involvement with the Bay of Pigs Invasion operation, and stated that "Kennedy had been responsible for him having to watch all the men he recruited and trained get wiped out." Carbajal claimed that Morales said, "Well, we took care of that SOB, didn't we?"

Morales is alleged to have once told friends, "I was in Dallas when we got the son of a bitch, and I was in Los Angeles when we got the little bastard", presumably referring to the assassination of President Kennedy in Dallas, Texas, and to the later assassination of Senator Robert F. Kennedy in Los Angeles, California, on June 5, 1968. Morales is alleged to have expressed deep anger toward the Kennedys for what he saw as their betrayal during the Bay of Pigs Invasion.

=== Frank Sturgis ===
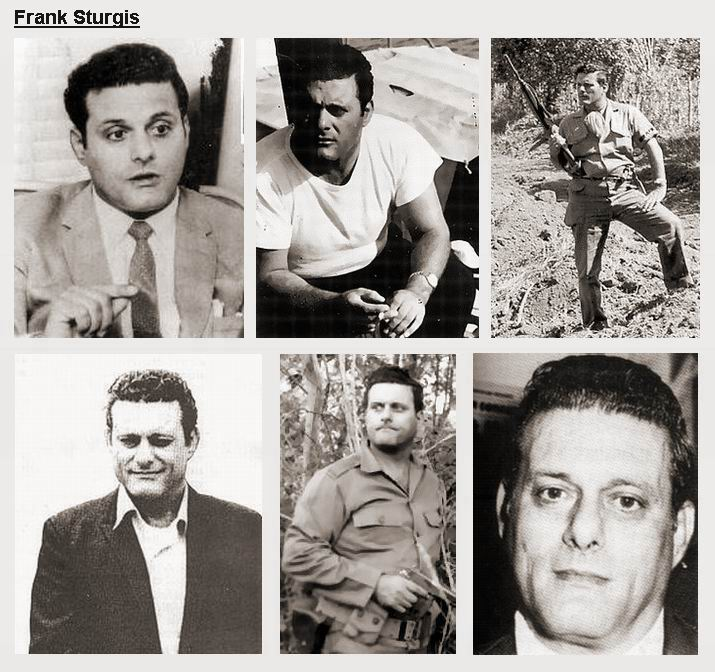
Photos of Frank Sturgis

In an article published in the South Florida Sun Sentinel on December 4, 1963, James Buchanan, a former reporter for the Sun-Sentinel, claimed that Frank Sturgis had met Lee Harvey Oswald in Miami, Florida, shortly before Kennedy's assassination. Buchanan claimed that Oswald had tried to infiltrate the International Anti-Communist Brigade. When he was questioned by the FBI about this story, Sturgis claimed that Buchanan had misquoted him regarding his comments about Oswald.

According to a memo sent by L. Patrick Gray, acting FBI Director, to H. R. Haldeman on June 19, 1972, "[s]ources in Miami say he [Sturgis] is now associated with organized crime activities". In his book, Assassination of JFK, published in 1977, Bernard Fensterwald claims that Sturgis was heavily involved with the Mafia, particularly with Santo Trafficante's and Meyer Lansky's activities in Florida.

=== George de Mohrenschildt ===
After returning from the Soviet Union, Lee Harvey Oswald became friends with Dallas resident and petroleum geologist George de Mohrenschildt. Mohrenschildt would later write an extensive memoir in which he discussed his friendship with Oswald. Mohrenschildt's wife would later give the House Select Committee on Assassinations a photograph that showed Oswald in his Dallas backyard, holding two Marxist newspapers and a Carcano rifle, with a pistol on his hip. Thirteen years after the JFK assassination, in September 1976, the CIA requested that the FBI locate Mohrenschildt, in response to a letter Mohrenschildt had written to his friend, CIA Director George H. W. Bush, appealing to Bush to stop the agency from taking action against him.

Several Warren Commission critics, including Jesse Ventura, have alleged that Mohrenschildt was one of Oswald's CIA handlers but have offered little evidence. Jim Garrison referred to Mohrenschildt as one of Oswald's unwitting "baby-sitters ... assigned to protect or otherwise see to the general welfare of Oswald". On March 29, 1977, Mohrenschildt stated during an interview with author Edward Jay Epstein that he had been asked by CIA operative J. Walton Moore to meet with Oswald, something Mohrenschildt had also told the Warren Commission thirteen years earlier. When interviewed in 1978 by the House Select Committee on Assassinations, J. Walton Moore said that while he "had 'periodic' contact with Mohrenschildt", he had no recollection of any conversation with him concerning Oswald.

Mohrenschildt told Epstein that he would not have contacted Oswald had he not been asked to do so. (Mohrenschildt met with Oswald several times, from the summer of 1962 to April 1963.) The same day that Mohrenschildt was interviewed by Epstein, Mohrenschildt was informed by his daughter that a representative of the House Select Committee on Assassinations had stopped by and left his calling card, intending to return that evening. Mohrenschildt then committed suicide by shooting himself in the head shortly thereafter. Mohrenschildt's wife later told sheriff's office investigators that her husband had been hospitalized for depression and paranoia in late 1976 and had tried to kill himself four times that year.

=== Role of Oswald ===
In 1964, the Warren Commission concluded that Oswald killed Kennedy and Tippit and that Oswald acted alone, and that "there is no evidence that [Oswald] was involved in any conspiracy directed to the assassination of the President." The Commission came to this conclusion after examining Oswald's Marxist and pro-Communist background, including his defection to Russia, the New Orleans branch of the Fair Play for Cuba Committee he had organized, and the various public and private statements made by him espousing Marxism.

Some conspiracy theorists have argued that Oswald's pro-Communist behavior may have been a carefully planned ruse — a part of an effort by U.S. intelligence agencies to infiltrate left-wing organizations in the United States and to conduct counterintelligence operations. Others have speculated that Oswald was an agent or informant of the U.S. government, and was manipulated by his U.S. intelligence handlers to incriminate himself while being set up as a scapegoat.

Sean Murphy theorised that a man who was filmed by Dave Wiegman, Jr., of NBC, and James Darnell of WBAP-TV, standing on the Depository front steps during the assassination, dubbed the "prayer man", was Oswald.

Some researchers have suggested that Oswald was an active agent of the Central Intelligence Agency, pointing to the fact that Oswald attempted to defect to Russia but was nonetheless able to return without difficulty (even receiving a repatriation loan from the State Department) as evidence of such. Oswald's mother, Marguerite, often insisted that her son was recruited by an agency of the U.S. Government and sent to Russia. New Orleans District Attorney, and later judge, Jim Garrison, who in 1967 brought Clay Shaw to trial for the assassination of President Kennedy also held the opinion that Oswald was most likely a CIA agent who had been drawn into the plot to be used as a scapegoat, even going as far as to say that Oswald "genuinely was probably a hero".

Senator Richard Schweiker, a member of the U.S. Senate Select Committee on Intelligence remarked that "everywhere you look with [Oswald], there're fingerprints of intelligence". Schweiker also told author David Talbot that Oswald "was the product of a fake defector program run by the CIA." Richard Sprague, interim staff director and chief counsel to the U.S. House Select Committee on Assassinations, stated that if he "had to do it over again", he would have investigated the Kennedy assassination by probing Oswald's ties to the Central Intelligence Agency.

In 1978, James Wilcott, a former CIA finance officer, testified before the HSCA (Note: see "Testimony of James B. Wilcott, a former employee of the Central Intelligence Agency" (PDF). HSCA hearings. March 22, 1978.) that shortly after the assassination of President Kennedy he was advised by fellow employees at a CIA post abroad that Oswald was a CIA agent who had received financial disbursements under an assigned cryptonym. Wilcott was unable to identify the specific case officer who had initially informed him of Oswald's agency relationship, nor was he able to recall the name of the cryptonym, but he named several employees of the post abroad with whom he believed he had subsequently discussed the allegations. Later that year Wilcott and his wife, Elsie, also a former employee of the CIA, repeated those claims in an article in the San Francisco Chronicle. The HSCA investigated Wilcott's claims- including interviews with the chief and deputy chief of station, as well as officers in finance, registry, the Soviet Branch and counterintelligence - and concluded in their 1979 report they were "not worthy of belief".

Despite its official policy of neither confirming nor denying the status of agents, both the CIA itself and many officers working in the region at the time (including David Atlee Phillips) have "unofficially" dismissed the plausibility of any CIA ties to Oswald. Robert Blakey, staff director and chief counsel for the U.S. House Select Committee on Assassinations supported that assessment in his conclusions as well. The House Select Committee on Assassinations found no evidence of any relationship between Oswald and the CIA.

== Organized crime and a CIA conspiracy ==
Some conspiracy theorists have alleged a plot involving elements of the Mafia, the CIA and the anti-Castro Cubans, including author Anthony Summers and journalist Ruben Castaneda. They cite U.S. government documents which show that, beginning in 1960, these groups had worked together in assassination attempts against Cuban leader Fidel Castro. Ruben Castaneda wrote: "Based on the evidence, it is likely that JFK was killed by a coalition of anti-Castro Cubans, the Mob, and elements of the CIA." In his book, They Killed Our President, former Minnesota governor Jesse Ventura also concluded: "John F. Kennedy was murdered by a conspiracy involving disgruntled CIA agents, anti-Castro Cubans, and members of the Mafia, all of whom were extremely angry at what they viewed as Kennedy's appeasement policies toward Communist Cuba and the Soviet Union."

Jack Van Lanningham, a prison cellmate of Mafia boss Carlos Marcello, claimed that Marcello confessed to him in 1985 to having organized Kennedy's assassination. Lanningham also claimed that the FBI covered up the taped confession which he said the FBI had in its possession. Robert Blakey, who was chief counsel for the House Select Committee on Assassinations, concluded in his book, The Plot to Kill the President, that Marcello was likely part of a Mafia conspiracy behind the assassination, and that the Mafia had the means, motive, and opportunity required to carry it out.
