= Donald Freed =

American playwright, novelist and historian (born 1932)

- Born: May 13, 1932 (age 94)
- Education: University of Illinois; Goodman School of Drama; California State University, Northridge; University of California, Los Angeles
- Known for: Playwright, Novelist, Screenwriter, Historian, Teacher and Activist
- Notable work: Death in Washington: The Murder of Orlando Letelier; Circe & Bravo; Agony in New Haven; Inquest
- Awards: Berlin Critics Award; NEA Award for "Distinguished Writing"; PEN Award

Donald Freed (born May 13, 1932) is an American playwright, novelist, screenwriter, historian, teacher and activist. According to Freed's friend and colleague, the late Nobel Laureate Harold Pinter, "(Freed) is a writer of blazing imagination, courage and insight. His work is a unique and fearless marriage of politics and art."

== Early life ==
Freed was born May 13, 1932, in Chicago, Illinois, the only son of Jeanne (Greene) and David J. Freed, an attorney; the couple later divorced. Freed maintained a relationship with his father David throughout his life, although he was young when his parents separated. His mother remarried Arthur Malsin, a merchant by trade. At age 4, Freed moved with his mother and stepfather to Eagle River, Wisconsin. Three years later, Freed's mother and stepfather moved again, to Alexandria, Louisiana. Freed is the eldest of his four half-siblings: Lynnel Hope, Anne, Paulette, and Byron. From 1939 to 1949, he was educated at West End Grammar School, Bolton High School, St. John's Military Academy in Delafield, Wisconsin, and Louisiana College.

Malsin, Freed's stepfather, was "a successful merchant selling clothing for a time, then military gear, and later soft drinks. After World War II, when the wartime boom deflated and prices soared, his stepfather’s business collapsed and he committed suicide". Freed has said that many people have known a Willy Loman in their lives. He referred to Arthur Miller's classic play, Death of a Salesman, in which the protagonist committed suicide, hoping his death would provide insurance to help his family survive. Freed's mother Jeanne supported his family until she died of cancer at 42. She sold insurance "in the back roads of Louisiana".

Freed's higher education began in 1949 at the University of Illinois; in 1950 he studied at the Goodman School of Drama in Chicago. Upon moving to Los Angeles, he attended California State University, Northridge and the University of California, Los Angeles. Special Studies included Aesthetics with Professor Leon Katz, and Psychoanalytic Studies in Literature with Lawrence J. Friedman, M.D. and Milton Lester, M.D.

== Career ==
=== Theater ===
Freed's professional career began in 1958 as artistic director of the Valley Playhouse in Tarzana, California, where he acted and directed. He took leading roles in The Country Girl, The Lady's Not for Burning, The Lower Depths, Voice of the Turtle, Taming of the Shrew, and Cat on a Hot Tin Roof. He directed Joe Stern in Detective Story, Harry Towne in Separate Tables, and Guy Stockwell in Billy Budd. In 1960, Freed became artistic director of the Los Angeles Art Theatre (LAAT), based in the Coronet Theatre. There he directed Summer and Smoke (with Joan Tomkins), The Seagull (with Guy Stockwell and Barboura Morris), Hamlet (Stockwell, Morris, and John Larkin), Crime and Punishment (Stockwell).

In 1965, he directed Hamlet and Crime and Punishment in repertory at the Lindy Opera House in Los Angeles.

In 1969, Freed's play Inquest established him as a playwright, with productions occurring in New York, Hungary, Japan, Cleveland, and Los Angeles.

==== Residencies ====
Freed has been in residence at Los Angeles Art Theatre/Coronet Theatre (1960–1963); Yale University Press (1972); University of Southern California (1982–2007); Los Angeles Theatre Center (1983–1989); the Jonathan Reynolds Chair at Denison University (2004); Mercury Theatre, United Kingdom (2005); University of Leeds, United Kingdom (2006); York Theatre Royal, United Kingdom (2007); The Old Vic, United Kingdom (2007).

=== Investigative journalism ===
Freed also has been an investigative journalist publishing articles and books related mostly to politics and civil rights movements. Freed was affiliated with the Citizens Research and Investigation Committee (C.R.I.C.), a Los Angeles-based group of investigative journalists active in the 1960s and 1970s.

==== FBI disinformation campaign ====
Freed was a member of the Friends of the Panthers, a group of white supporters of the Black Panther movement. He was a close friend of Huey Percy Newton, a political activist and founding member of the Black Panther Party. Freed acted as one of the unofficial historians of the Black Panther Party, and served as one of the advisors to Newton's doctoral thesis (The War Against the Panthers) for the University of California.

According to Richard Stayton, who wrote an introduction to a 2003 collection of plays by Freed, in 1969 the FBI, in an effort to drive distrust between Freed and the Black Panther Party, began a disinformation campaign against him and added him to Nixon's enemies list. FBI case agent, Phil Denny, ensured that Freed lost his teaching contract at the San Fernando Valley State College and that the California State College in Fullerton would not hire him. Stayton also said that in July 1969, Hoover approved the distribution of leaflets falsely stating that Freed “is a PIG” and a law enforcement informant. The campaign against Freed was unsuccessful.

In 1973, Freed published Agony in New Haven, a book that explored the implications of racial bias in jury selection in the 1970s trial of Bobby Seale and Ericka Huggins, leaders of the Black Panther Party.

==== Death in Washington ====
In their 1980 book Death in Washington, Freed and Fred Landis, a political science teacher at Cal State Los Angeles, charged that the Central Intelligence Agency was involved in the 1973 Chilean coup d'état and the 1976 assassination of Orlando Letelier. The authors specifically named David Atlee Phillips as being involved in a cover-up of the assassination. They also repeated Gaeton Fonzi's claim that Phillips had earlier served as Lee Harvey Oswald's case officer and used the alias "Maurice Bishop". In 1982, Freed, Landis, and their publisher were named in a $230 million libel suit by Phillips and the Association of Former Intelligence Officers. A settlement was reached in 1986 with Phillips receiving a retraction and an unspecified amount of money.

==== O.J. Simpson ====
In 1996, Freed and Raymond P. Briggs, a professor at American Heritage University, wrote Killing Time: The First Full Investigation into the Unsolved Murders of Nicole Brown Simpson and Ronald Goldman. The book focused on the timeline of the crime events and the forensic evidence developed in the investigation. The book received mixed reviews and generated controversy. In an interview on Larry King Live, Ron Goldman's father called into the show and berated Freed about the book.

=== Work for Peoples Temple and Jonestown Tragedy ===
Freed visited Jonestown before the mass suicide of over 900 members of Peoples Temple. Freed's visit followed his being contacted by Jim Jones, who wanted him and Mark Lane to uncover alleged plots by intelligence agencies against the Temple.

In the summer of 1978, Peoples Temple hired Lane and Freed to investigate what it alleged to be a "grand conspiracy" by intelligence agencies against Peoples Temple. Temple member Edith Roller wrote in her journal that Freed said a Temple defector pressing for a U.S. investigation of Jonestown "was a CIA agent before coming to the Temple."

In August 1978, Freed visited Jonestown and encouraged Lane to visit. Lane held press conferences with the results of his and Freed's visits to Jonestown, stating that "none of the charges" against the Temple "are accurate or true". They said that there was a "massive conspiracy" against the Temple by "intelligence organizations," naming the CIA, FCC, and the U.S. Post Office.

Temple member Annie Moore wrote: "Mom and Dad have probably shown you the latest about the conspiracy information that Mark Lane, the famous attorney in the ML King case and Don Freed the other famous author in the Kennedy case have come up with regarding activities planned against us—Peoples Temple." Another Temple member, Carolyn Layton, wrote that Freed told them that "anything this dragged out could be nothing less than conspiracy."

A month later, on November 18, 1978, more than 900 Temple members committed mass suicide in Jonestown. Congressman Leo Ryan, NBC reporter Don Harris and others who had flown there to visit were murdered at a nearby airstrip. Jones had created fear among members by stating that the CIA and other intelligence agencies were conspiring with "capitalist pigs" to destroy Jonestown and harm its members.

== Selected writings ==
Plays

- Crime and Punishment (1960)
- The Gandhi Play (1969)
- Inquest (1969) (dir. Alan Schneider), about the trial of Julius and Ethel Rosenberg
- Secret Honor: The Last Testament of Richard M. Nixon with Arthur M. Stone (1983)
- Circe and Bravo (1984)(Perf. Faye Dunaway; dir. Harold Pinter)
- Quartered Man (1988) published by Broadway Play Publishing Inc.
- The Last Hero (1988)
- Alfred and Victoria: A Life (1988)
- The White Crow (1989) published by Broadway Play Publishing Inc.
- Veterans Day (1989) (Perf. Jack Lemmon and Michael Gambon)
- Is He Still Dead? (1990) (Perf. Julie Harris (Nora Joyce)
- Child of Luck (1990)
- American Iliad (2000)
- How Shall We Be Saved? (2002) published by Broadway Play Publishing Inc.
- The Death Of Ivan Ilych (2004) published by Broadway Play Publishing Inc.
- The Devil's Advocate (2005) (about U.S. invasion of Panama and President Manuel Noriega) published by Broadway Play Publishing Inc.
- Patient No. 1 (2006) published by Broadway Play Publishing Inc.
- Hamlet (In Rehearsal) (2008) published by Broadway Play Publishing Inc.
- The Einstein Plan (2010)
- 1951–2006 (2010) published by Broadway Play Publishing Inc.
- Sokrates Must Die (2010) (Perf. Edward Asner)
- Tomorrow (2013) published by Broadway Play Publishing Inc.

Prose fiction

- Executive Action with Mark Lane (Dell Publishing, 1973). Introduction by Richard Popkin.
- The China Card (Arbor House, 1980)
- The Spymaster (Arbor House, 1980)
- Every Third House (Penmarin Books, 2005)

Non-fiction prose

- Freud and Stanislavsky New York: Vantage Press, 1965.
- The Existentialism of Alberto Moravia (Co-author with Joan Ross). Carbonale: Southern Illinois UP, 1965. ISBN 0-8093-0549-6.
- In Search of Common Ground (Co-author with Erik Erikson, Kai Erikson, Huey P. Newton) New Haven: Yale University Press. 1971.
- The Glass House Tapes (editor), New York: Avon Books, 1972.
- Agony in New Haven: The Trial of Bobby Seale, Ericka Huggins, and the Black Panther Party. New York: Simon & Schuster, 1973. Rpt. Figueroa Press, forthcoming January 2008.
- The Killing of RFK. New York: Dell, 1975
- Death in Washington: The Murder of Orlando Letelier. Chicago: Lawrence Hill Books, 1980. ISBN 0-88208-124-1 (10). ISBN 978-0-88208-124-3 (13).
- Killing Time: The First Full Investigation into the Unsolved Murders of Nicole Brown Simpson and Ronald Goldman (Co-author with Raymond P. Briggs). New York: Macmillan General Reference, 1996. ISBN 0-02-861340-6 (10). ISBN 978-0-02-861340-6 (13).

Films

- Executive Action (with Dalton Trumbo and Mark Lane)
- Secret Honor with Arthur M. Stone (dir. Robert Altman)
- The King of Love
- Of Love and Shadows (adaptation of the novel by Isabel Allende)

== Honors and awards ==
- Berlin Critics Award
- Rockefeller Awards (3)
- Louis B. Mayer Awards (2)
- Unicorn Prize
- NEA Award for "Distinguished Writing"
- Los Angeles Critics' Awards (5)
- John Larkin Award
- Edinburgh Festival Prize
- Washington D.C. Fringe Prize
- Pen Award
- Avignon Festival 2019: Coups de Coeur for Le Cornbeau Blanc [The White Crow (Eichmann in Jerusalem)]
- American Civil Liberties Union of Southern California Award of Appreciation

== Personal life ==
In 1952, at 20, Freed married Patricia McGowan and the couple moved to Los Angeles, California three years later. They divorced in 1960.

In 1965, Freed married actress Barboura Morris. In 1975, the couple adopted Hugh Morris Freed, but Barboura died later that year. In 1980, Freed married Patricia Rae Ezor. They are still together after 40 years.

Freed and his wife Patricia Rae Freed, a former teacher who now represents him as an agent, live in Los Angeles. After his visiting appointment in Leeds and York, they returned to USC. He has taught in the United States' first multidisciplinary master's program in creative writing for 22 years".
