= Veciana (surname) =

Veciana is a surname. Notable people with the surname include:

- Ana Veciana-Suarez (born 1956), American columnist, author, and journalist
- Antonio Veciana (1928–2020), Cuban exile in the US
- Gustavo de Veciana, American computer scientist and engineer
