= Eldee =

Eldee may refer to:

- Eldee, Ontario, a community in Canada
- eLDee, a Nigerian musician
- Eldee Young, an American musician

== See also ==
- Eldee Foundation, a charitable organization
- Eldee Station, a pastoral lease in Australia
