= Julio Lobo =

Cuban sugar trader and financier

Julio Lobo y Olavarria (30 October 1898 – 30 January 1983) was a powerful Cuban sugar trader and financier. From the late 1930s to 1960, when he left Cuba to go into exile, Lobo was considered the single most powerful sugar broker in the world.

== Biography ==
=== Early life ===
Lobo was born in Caracas (Venezuela) to a father of Sephardi Jewish descent and a Catholic mother, and grew up in Havana, Cuba. As a young man he studied in the United States. He subsequently married into an old Cuban aristocratic family, the Montalvo family. Eventually he inherited his father's trading business and turned it into the world's largest sugar trading firm.

=== Cuban revolution ===
At the time of the success of the Cuban Revolution in 1959, Lobo's fortune was estimated at close to US$200 million (US$1.8 billion in 2020). His assets then included 16 sugar mills, over 30,000 acres of land, a bank, an insurance company, and offices in Havana, New York City, London, Madrid, and Manila. He owned the Havana bank Banco Financiero. American mafiosi used loans from the bank to build their hotels, namely the Hotel Capri and the Havana Riviera.

Following the Cuban revolution of 1959, Lobo was summoned to Havana by Che Guevara. He was informed that all of his sugar mills, other companies, and his houses were being appropriated by the newly formed Communist regime. However, knowing that Lobo was the only person in Cuba who knew how to run the sugar refineries, Guevara offered Lobo a job as the head of the sugar industry in Cuba. If he accepted, Lobo would be granted one sugar mill and one personal residence. Lobo told Guevara he needed to think it over. The next day, Lobo boarded his private plane and left Cuba, never to return. At first Lobo did not believe Castro would last long. He told William Attwood of Look magazine in 1959 that Castro would "not live out the year" because there was a contract out for his death.

Lobo left Cuba for Miami in October 1961. Here he funded the activities of the Cuban paramilitary group Alpha 66, led by a former Banco Financiero employee of his Antonio Veciana, who according to the CIA he gave "large sums of money" to in 1962. He offered to commit $250,000 for future Alpha 66 attacks. Lobo vouched for Veciana with skeptical American government officials, telling Thomas C. Mann that he was "reliable".

== Personal life ==
A renowned art connoisseur, Lobo also acquired the largest collection of Napoleonic memorabilia outside of France. The collection is housed today in Havana in the former home of Orestes Ferrara, at the Napoleon Museum (Havana). Many of the books and manuscripts from Lobo's collection were moved to the Biblioteca Nacional de Cuba José Martí.

Lobo died in Madrid on January 30, 1983, and is buried at the Almudena Cathedral next to Spain's Palacio Real.
