= Bloomfield Stadium =

Football stadium in Tel Aviv, Israel

Coordinates: 32°3′6.22″N 34°45′41.18″E

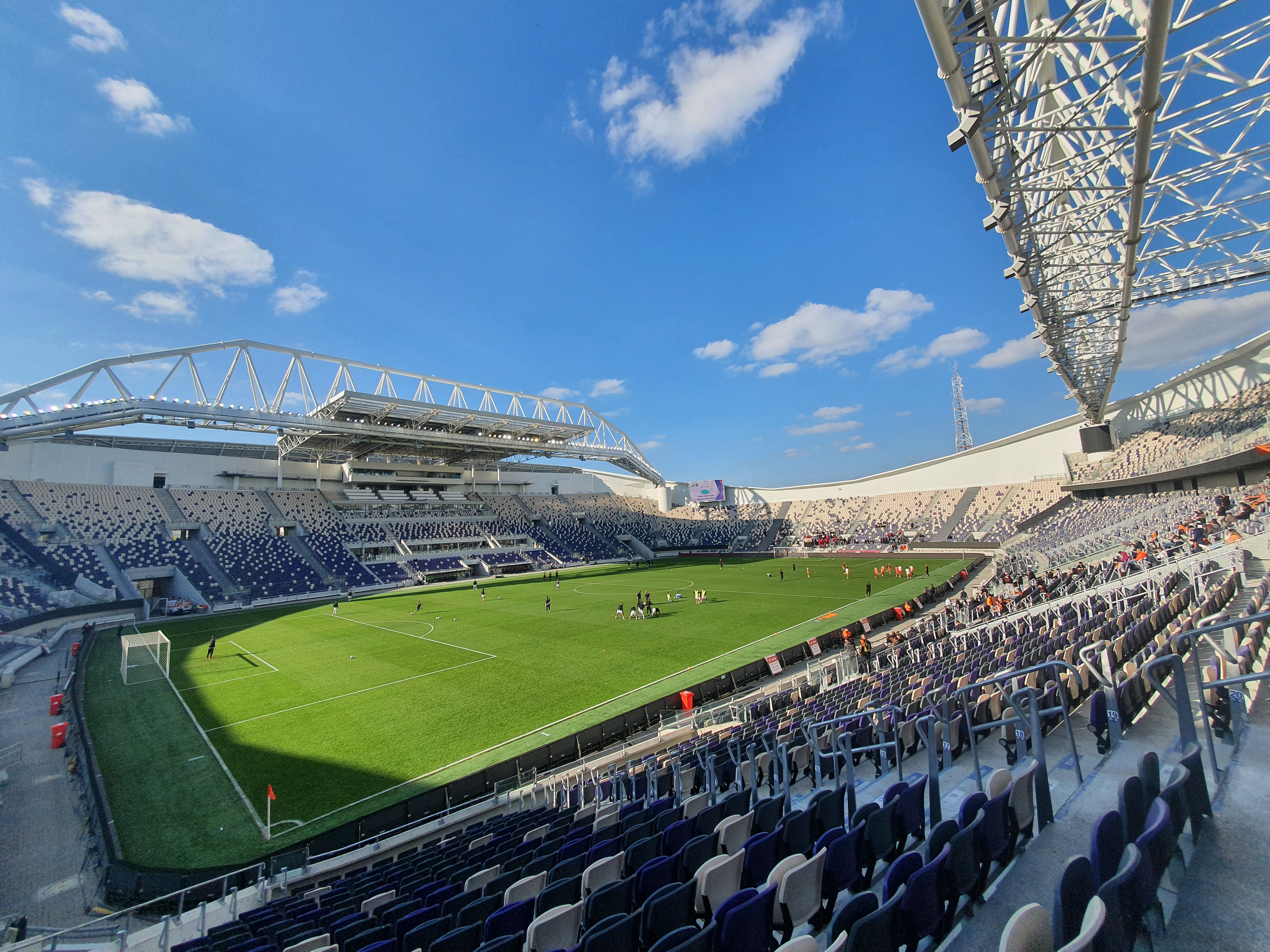
- UEFA
- Interactive map of Bloomfield Stadium
- Address: 5 Hatkuma Street
- Location: Tel Aviv, Israel
- Owner: Tel Aviv-Yafo Municipality
- Operator: Sport Palaces Tel Aviv Yafo Ltd.
- Capacity: 29,400
- Executive suites: 10
- Surface: Grass
- Scoreboard: LED
- Public transit: at Bloomfield Stadium

Construction
- Groundbreaking: 4 September 1960; 66 years ago
- Opened: 13 October 1962; 64 years ago
- Renovated: 2000, 2008–2010, 2012, 2016–2019
- Cost: IL1.5 million (1962) ₪500 million (2019)
- Architects: M.Galpaz and S.Shvartz Architects (1962); Mansfeld–Kehat Architects Ltd. (2019)

Tenants
- Hapoel Tel Aviv (1962–present); Maccabi Tel Aviv (1963–1966, 1969–1985, 1986–1987, 1995–1996, 2000–present); Israel national football team (selected matches): Major sporting events hosted; 1964 AFC Asian Cup; 2013 UEFA European Under-21 Championship; 2021 Trophée des Champions; 2022 Trophée des Champions

Website
- Bloomfield Stadium

Bloomfield Stadium (Hebrew: אצטדיון בלומפילד) is a football stadium in Tel Aviv, Israel, with a capacity of 29,400. It is the home stadium of Hapoel Tel Aviv and Maccabi Tel Aviv. The stadium also serves the Israel national football team for some select home matches.

== History ==
Bloomfield Stadium was built in Eastern Jaffa, on the land where Basa Stadium, home to Hapoel Tel Aviv since 1950, once stood. Finance for the stadium project came from the Canadian Association of Labour, Israel, a Canadian charity supporting the charitable works of the Hapoel Sports Movement of the Histadrut Labour Organization in Israel, the Bloomfield family of Montreal, Canada, directly and through their family foundation called the Eldee Foundation. The project was financed in Canada and intended to honor the names of brothers Bernard M. Bloomfield and Louis M. Bloomfield, Q.C. of Montreal, Canada for their lifelong dedication to the ideals of sport in Israel. The first match at the new stadium was a 1–1 draw between Hapoel and Shimshon Tel Aviv on 13 October 1962. The stadium officially opened on 13 December 1962 on a friendly match between Hapoel and Dutch club Sportclub Enschede.

In 1963, Maccabi Tel Aviv moved into Bloomfield Stadium after hosting of their matches at the Maccabiah Stadium, in 1985 Maccabi left Bloomfield Stadium for the Ramat Gan Stadium and in 2000, Maccabi returned to host at Bloomfield Stadium.

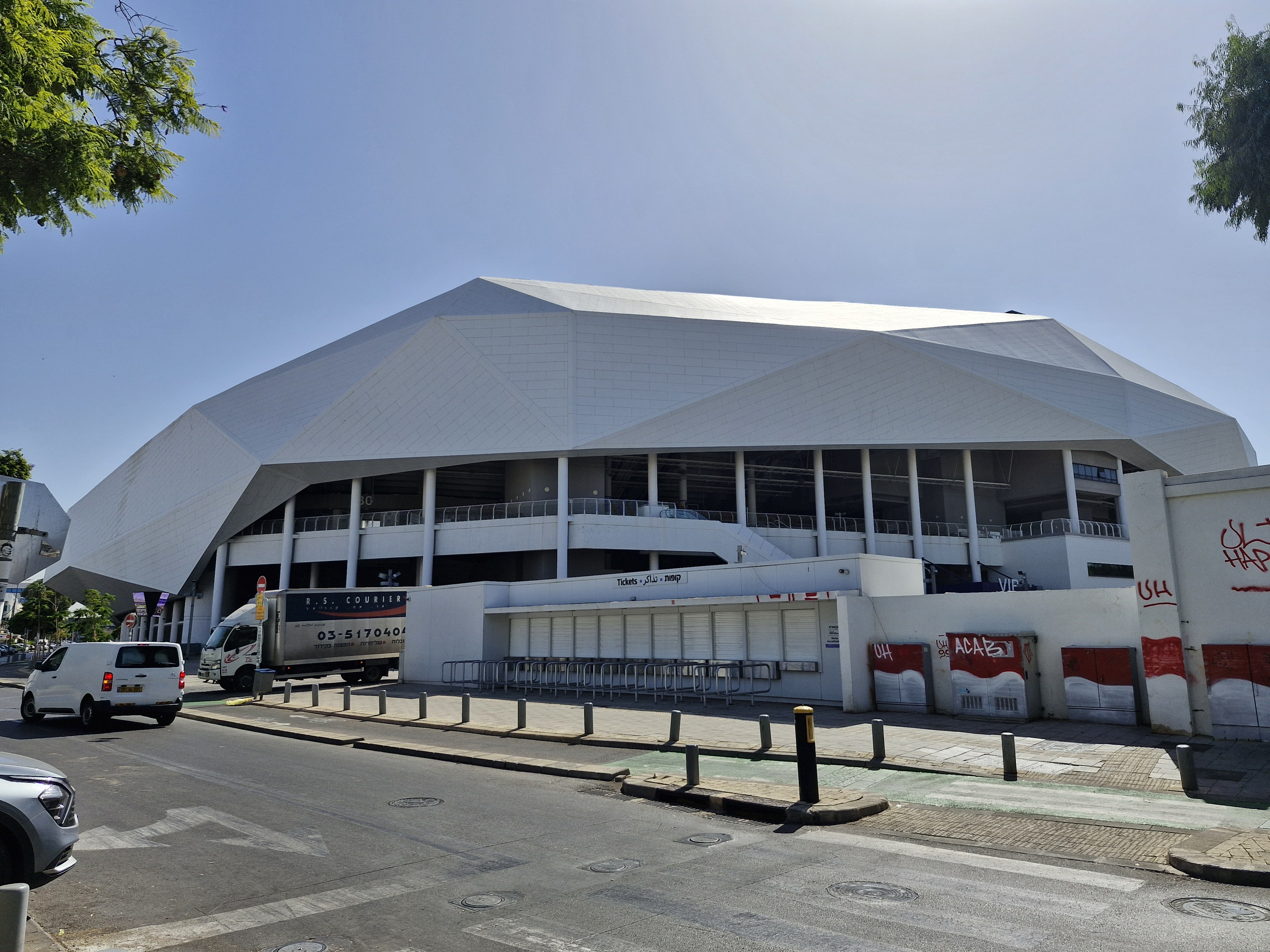
Bloomfield stadium from the outside

In 1964, Bloomfield Stadium hosted the 1964 AFC Asian Cup.

In 2004, Bnei Yehuda moved into Bloomfield Stadium making it the only stadium in the top three divisions of Israeli football to have three tenants.

In September 2010, Bloomfield Stadium was granted Category 4 status by UEFA, which will allow it to host Champions League Group stage matches.

It was one of four venues at the 2013 UEFA European Under-21 Football Championship, holding three matches in Group A.

Between 2016 and 2019, it was closed due to renovations for expansion to 29,000 seats. As a result, the three clubs had to play their home matches in Petah Tikva and Netanya up until August 2019.

When Israel allowed concerts to take place again after the COVID-19 pandemic, Bloomfield Stadium was one of the first arenas to let people in for live shows.

On 1 August 2021, Bloomfield Stadium hosted the 2021 Trophée des Champions between Lille and Paris Saint-Germain.

On 31 July 2022, Bloomfield Stadium hosted the 2022 Trophée des Champions between Paris Saint-Germain and FC Nantes.

== Location ==
The stadium is located between "Hatkuma", "She'erit Israel" and "Hathiya" streets and to the west of "Groningen Garden".

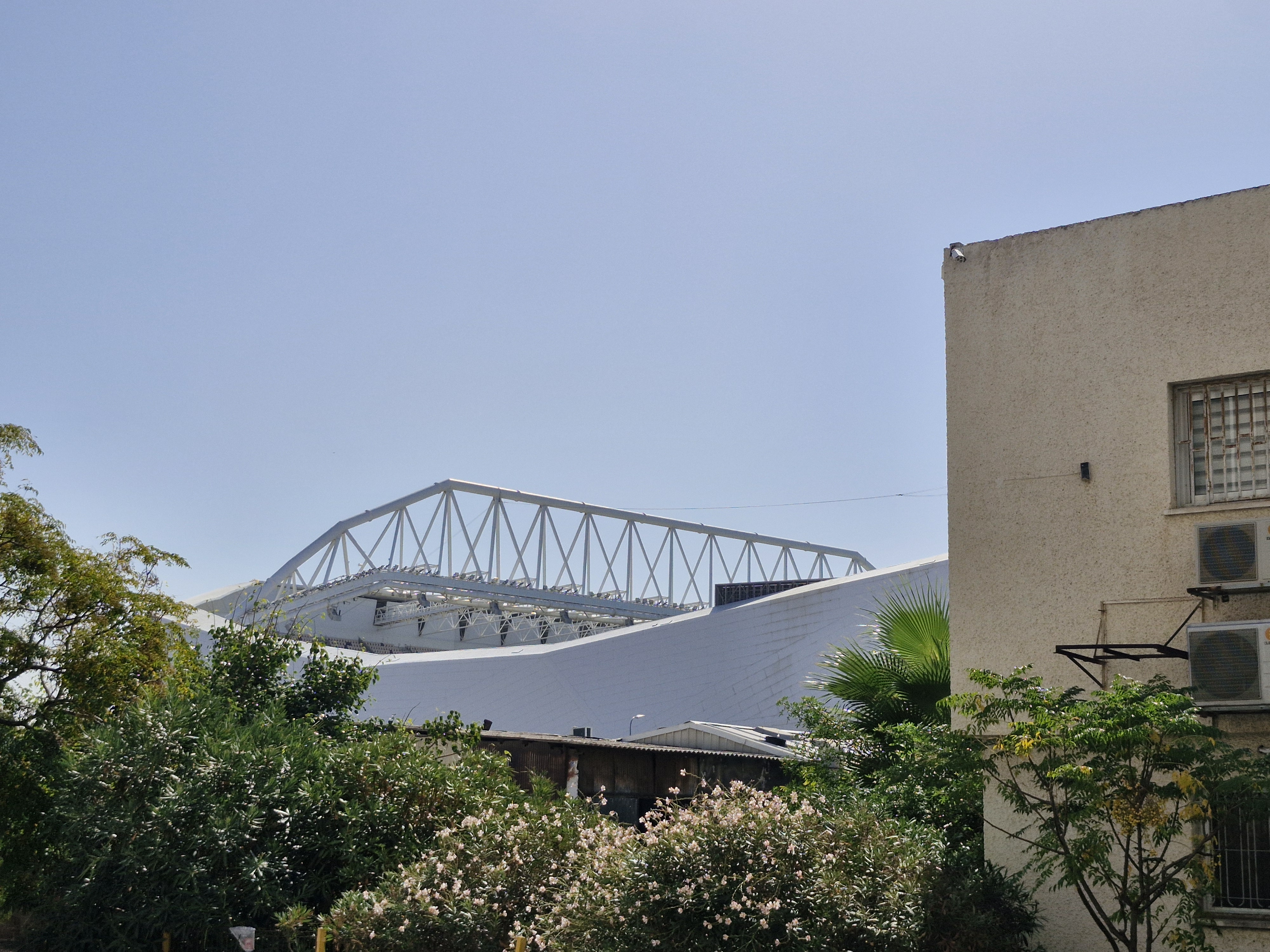
Bloomfield from afar

=== Transportation ===
The stadium is served by the "Bloomfield Stadium station" on the Red Line, located southwest of the stadium. It is also served by bus routes 1, 25, 40, 41, 42, 46, 125, 142 and 418.

== Concert venue ==
The stadium has hosted musical acts such as Pixies, Soundgarden, Phil Collins, the Black Eyed Peas, Scorpions, Andrea Bocelli, Barbra Streisand, and Rihanna.

== Gates ==
Gate	Entrance	Area	Seating capacity	Notes
1/VIP	24–27	204–206, 304–306, 404–406	1,316	Gold Tribune, Platinum Tribune, Press Tribune and Sky Box
2	28–30	207–209, 307–310	3,130	Home stand for Hapoel and Maccabi
4/5	41–48	214–217, 311–318	4,842	Home stand for Hapoel fan organization Ultras Hapoel. In Maccabi matches, this stand is used for visiting supporters.
7	71–74	221–224, 319–324, 419–424	5,338	Home stand for Hapoel and Maccabi
7/8	75–76	225, 325, 425	1,130	Home stand for Hapoel and Maccabi
8	77–80	226–229, 326–331, 426–431	5,342	Home stand for Maccabi and Hapoel
10/11	101–108	233–236, 332–339	4,861	Home stand for Maccabi fan organization Maccabi Fanatics. In Hapoel matches, this stand is used for visiting supporters
13	21–23	201–203, 300–303	3,149	Home stand for Hapoel and Maccabi

== International matches ==
Date		Result		Competition	Attendance
29 May 1964	Israel	2–0	India	1964 AFC Asian Cup	22,000
2 June 1964	India	3–1	Hong Kong	1964 AFC Asian Cup	5,000
17 March 1968	Israel	7–0	Ceylon	1968 Summer Olympics qualification	14,000
22 March 1968	Israel	4–0	Ceylon	1968 Summer Olympics qualification	10,000
28 March 1979	Israel	0–2	Belgium	1980 Summer Olympics qualification	17,000
30 October 1983	Israel	1–0	Portugal	1984 Summer Olympics qualification	8,000
20 November 1983	Israel	0–1	West Germany	1984 Summer Olympics qualification	17,000
11 October 1995	Israel	2–0	Azerbaijan	UEFA Euro 1996 qualifying	7,000
26 March 2011	Israel	2–1	Latvia	UEFA Euro 2012 qualifying	10,801
29 March 2011	Israel	1–0	Georgia	UEFA Euro 2012 qualifying	13,716
2 September 2011	Israel	0–1	Greece	UEFA Euro 2012 qualifying	13,100
25 March 2021	Israel	0–2	Denmark	2022 FIFA World Cup qualification	5,000
28 March 2021	Israel	1–1	Scotland	2022 FIFA World Cup qualification	5,000
24 September 2022	Israel	2–1	Albania	2022–23 UEFA Nations League	29,200
25 March 2023	Israel	1–1	Kosovo	UEFA Euro 2024 qualifying	28,935
12 September 2023	Israel	1–0	Belarus	UEFA Euro 2024 qualifying	28,435

== Gallery ==
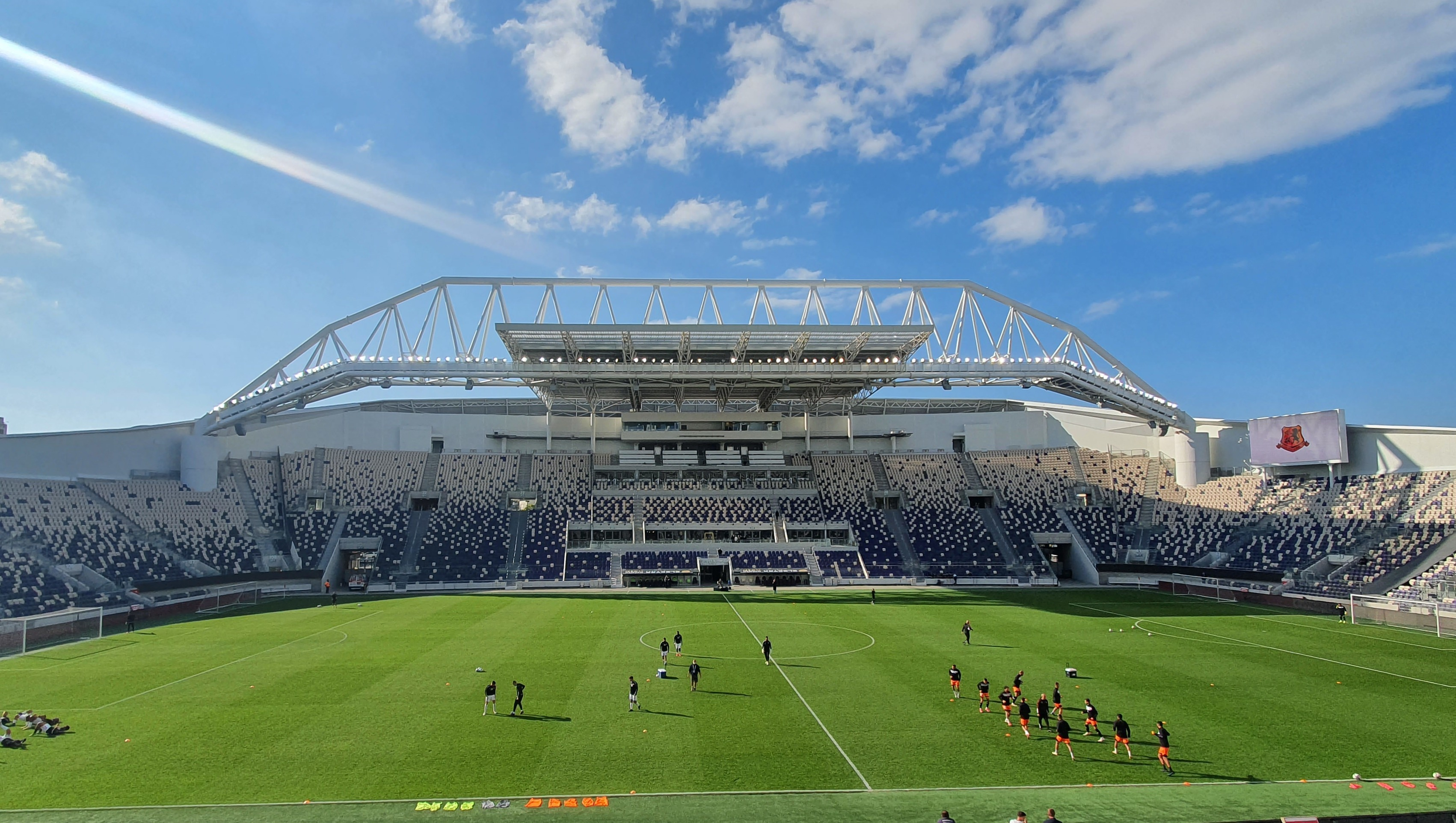

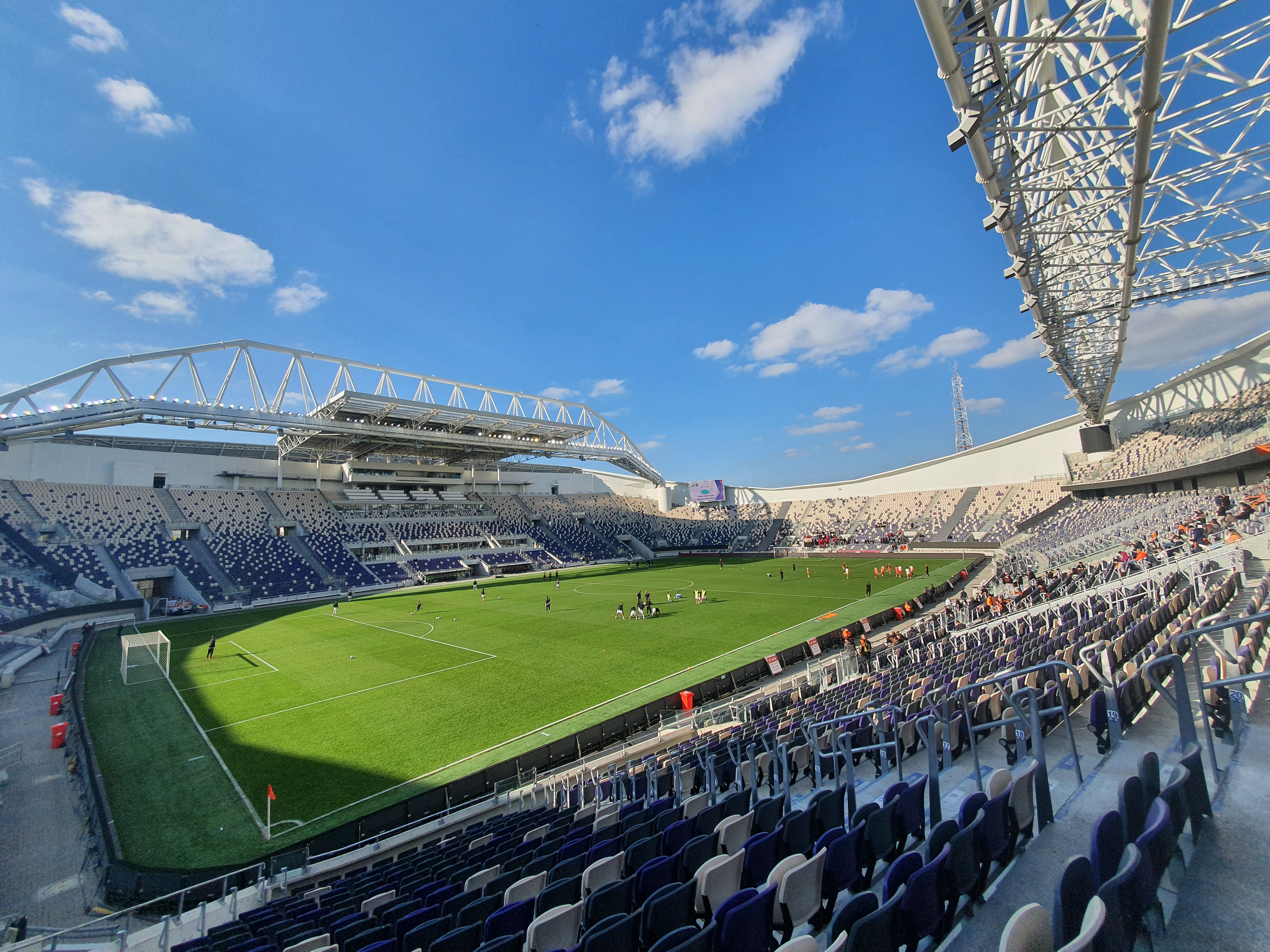

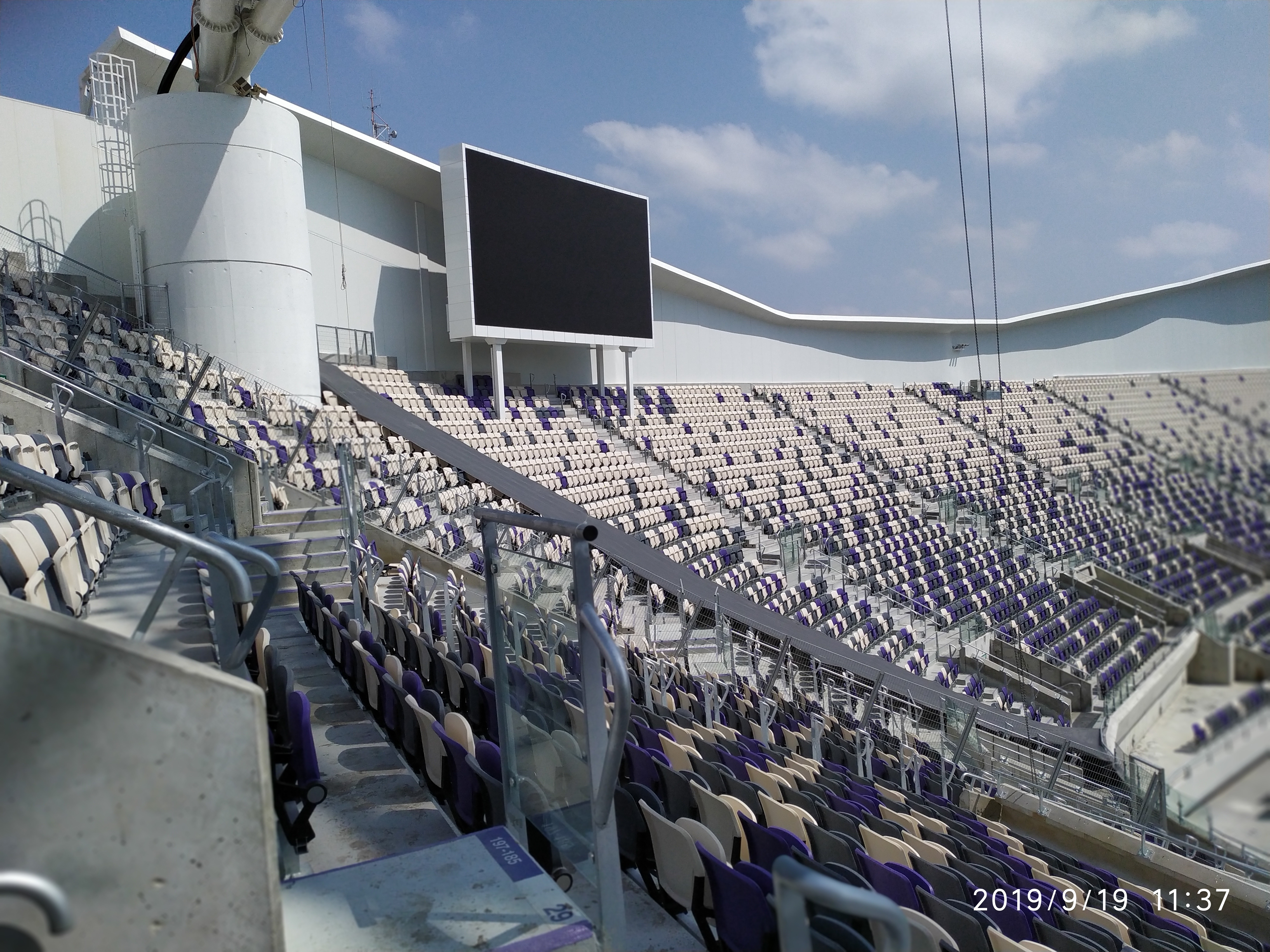

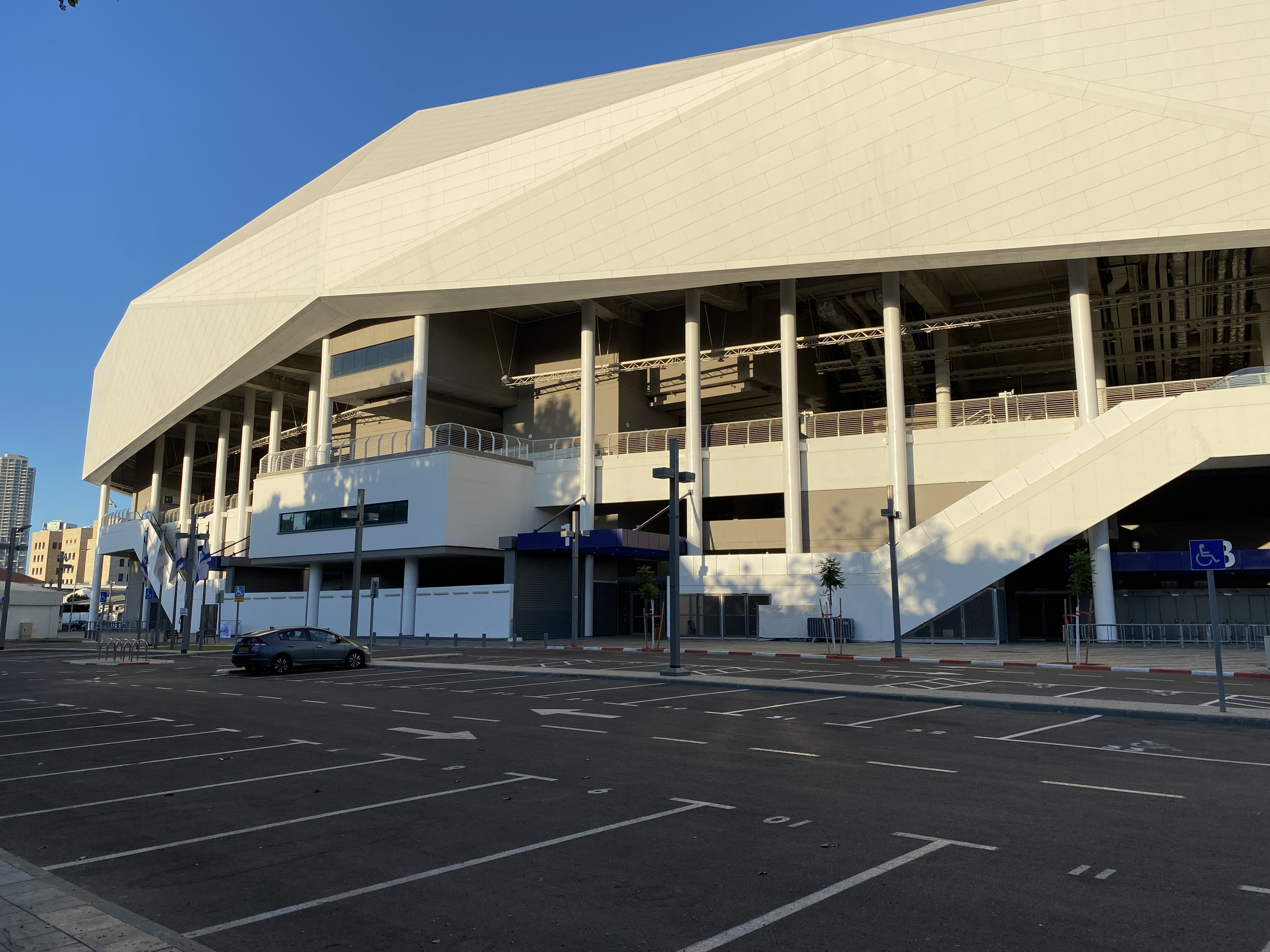

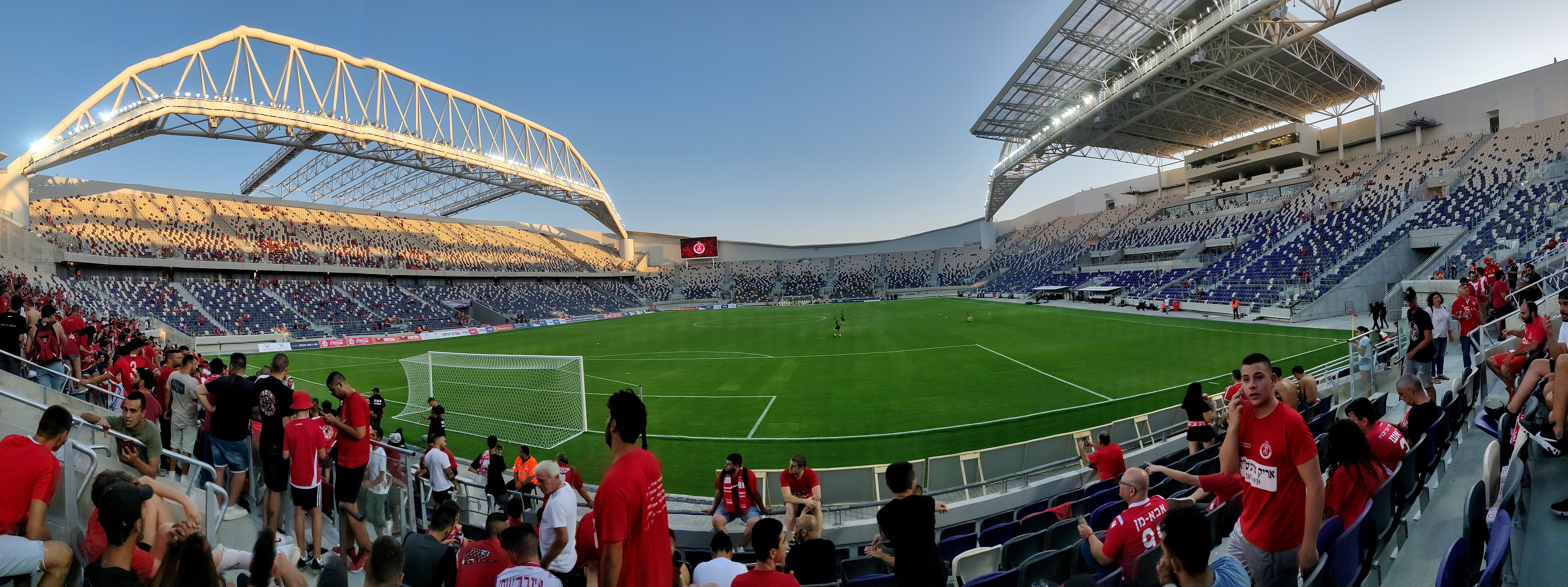

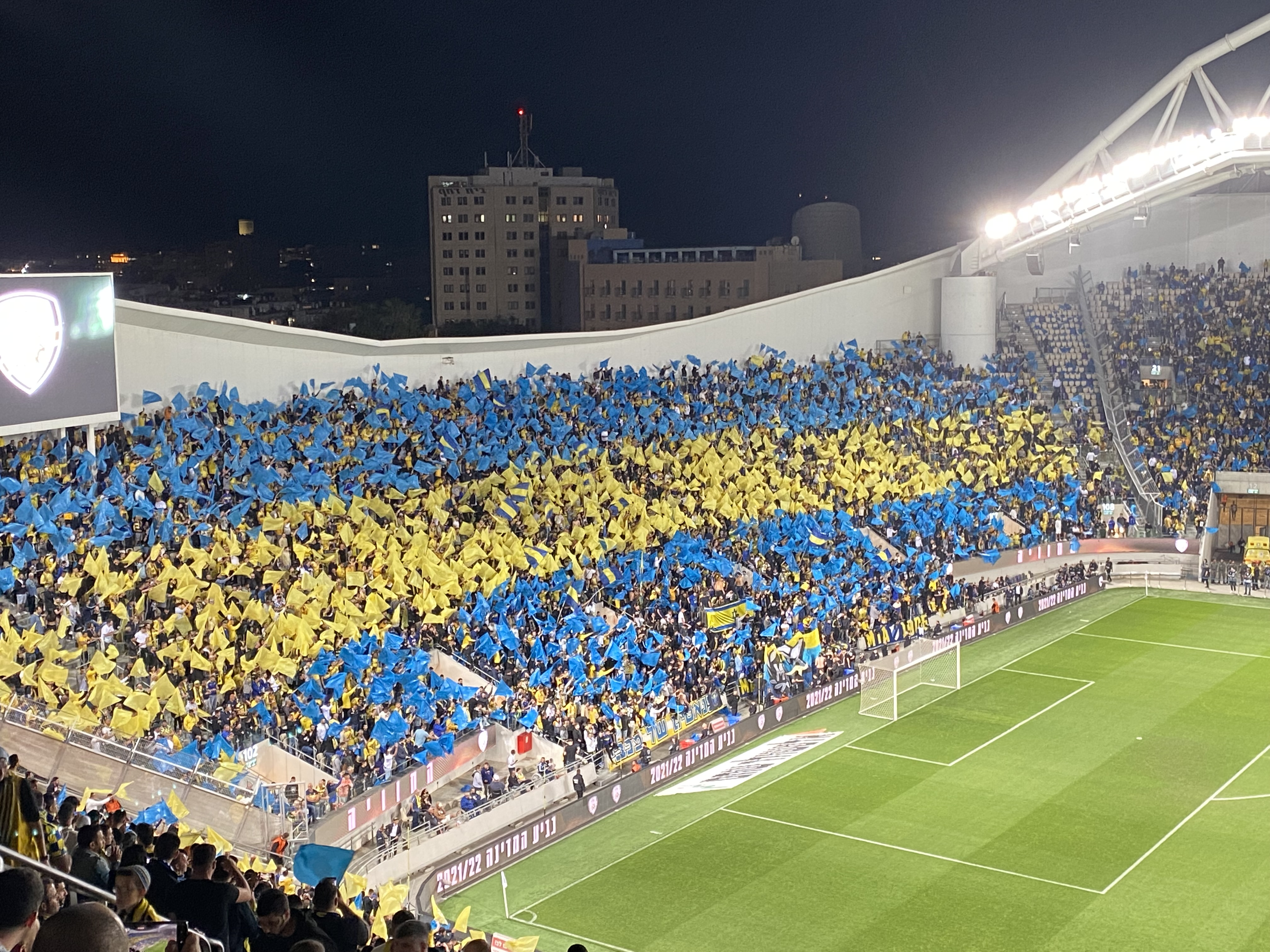

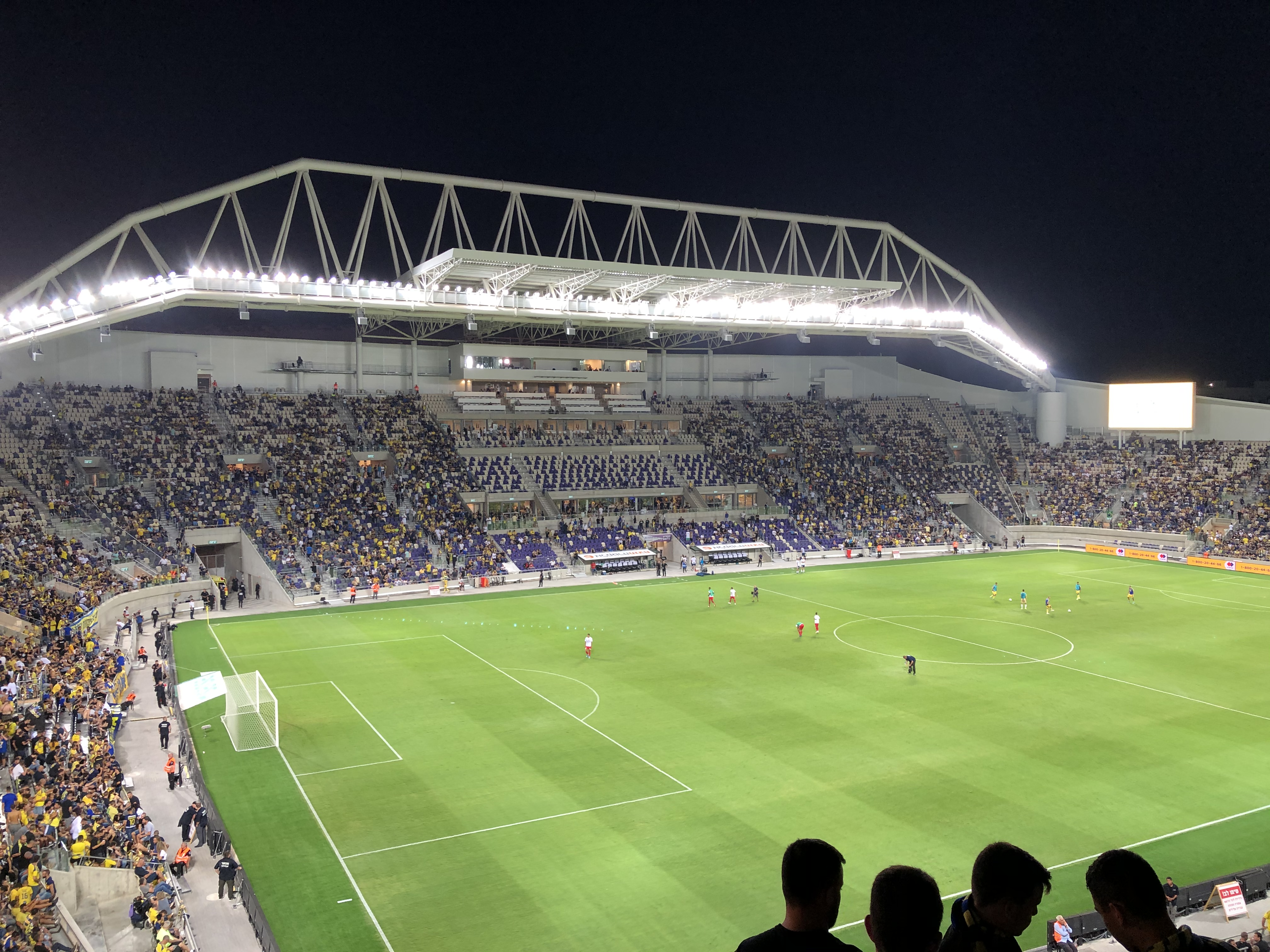

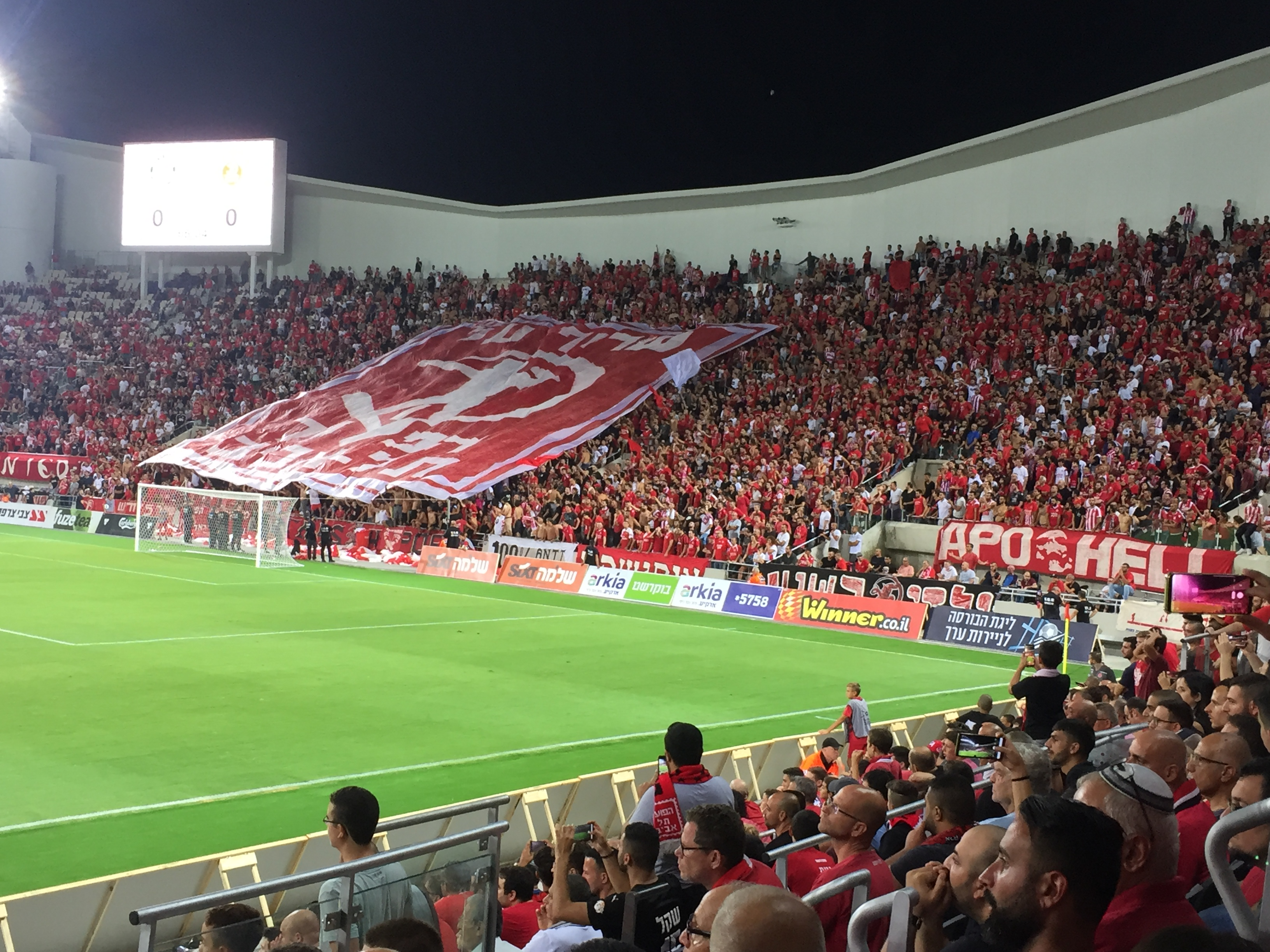

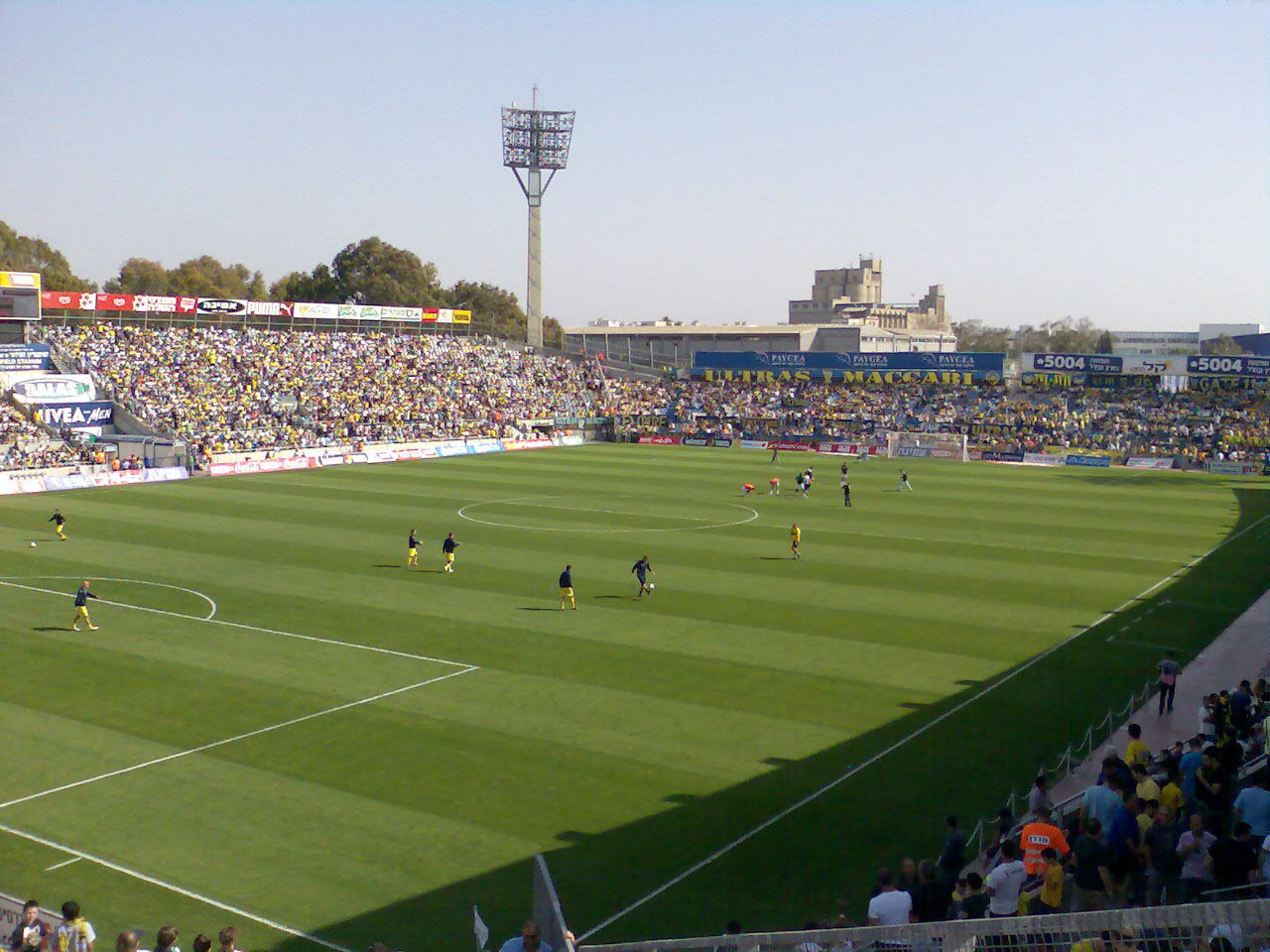

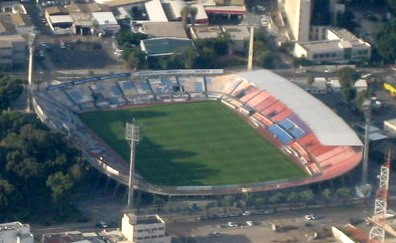

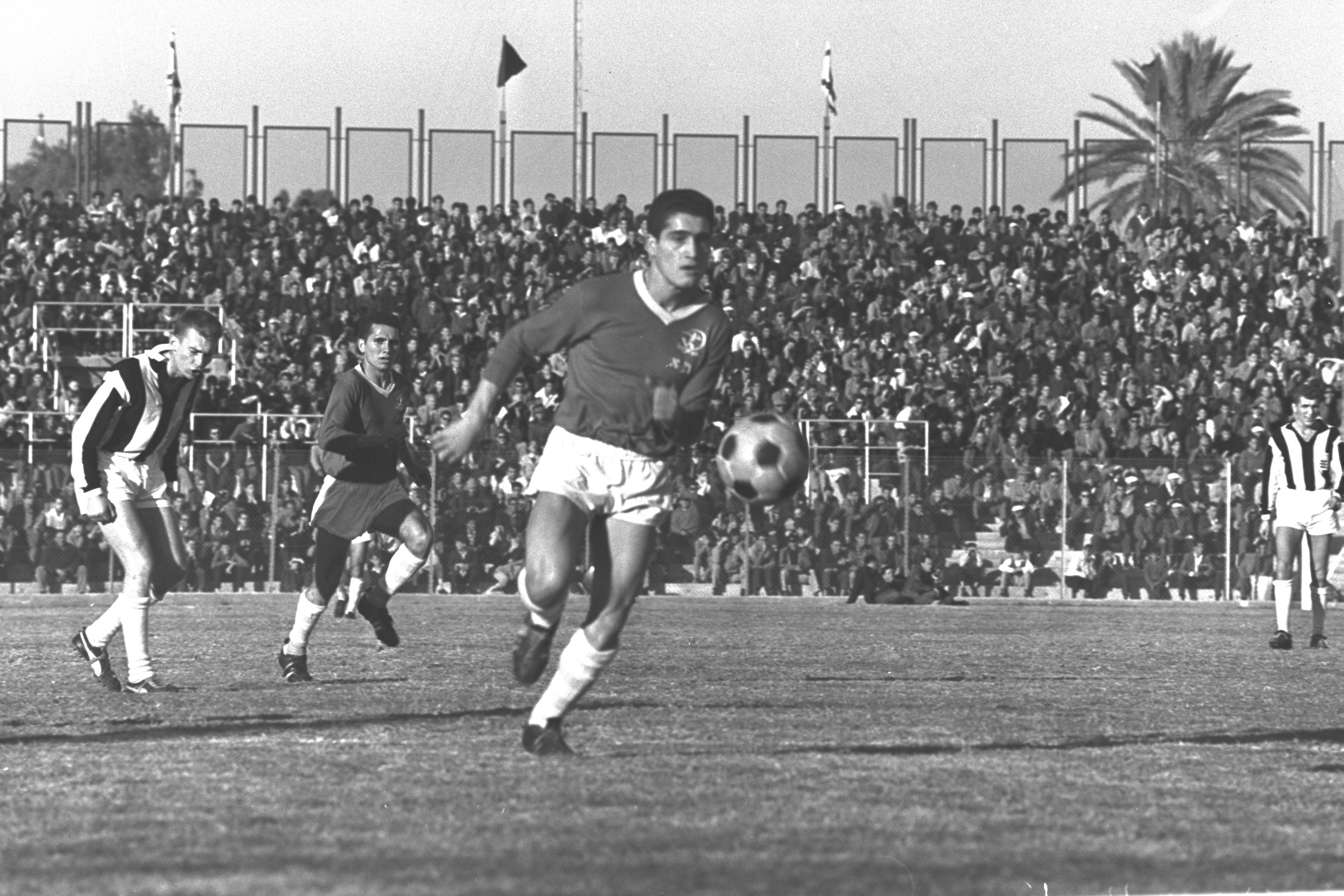

== See also ==
- List of football stadiums in Israel
- Tel Aviv derby
- Football in Israel
