= Gaeton Fonzi =

Investigative journalist and JFK assassination researcher (1935–2012)

Gaeton Fonzi (October 10, 1935 – August 30, 2012) was an American investigative journalist and author known for his work on the assassination of John F. Kennedy. He was a reporter and editor for Philadelphia magazine from 1959 to 1972, and contributed to a range of other publications, including The New York Times and Penthouse. He was hired as a researcher in 1975 by the Church Committee and by the House of Representatives Select Committee on Assassinations (HSCA) in 1977, and in 1993 published a book on the subject, The Last Investigation, detailing his experiences as a Congressional researcher as well as his conclusions about the JFK assassination.

== Background ==
Fonzi was born Gaetano Fonzi to Leonora and Gaetano Fonzi, a barber, in Philadelphia on October 10, 1935; he later shortened his first name. He grew up in West New York, New Jersey. He studied journalism at the University of Pennsylvania and edited its daily newspaper, The Daily Pennsylvanian.

== Career ==
Fonzi began his journalism career at the Delaware County Daily Times, before moving to Philadelphia magazine after serving in the army.

In 1966 he interviewed Arlan Specter of the Warren Commission, who had pioneered the single-bullet theory. In 1967, following a three-year investigation, Fonzi co-authored a Philadelphia magazine article exposing the activities of Harry Karafin, an award-winning American investigative journalist associated with The Philadelphia Inquirer who sought and accepted payment from potential reporting subjects in order to avoid negative coverage. Karafin was fired and then convicted on 40 counts of blackmail and corrupt solicitation.

In 1970, Fonzi published a book about Walter Annenberg and his publishing empire, which included The Philadelphia Inquirer. In 1972, having helped Philadelphia to its first National Magazine Award, Fonzi left Philadelphia and moved to Miami, where he worked on Miami Monthly and Gold Coast magazines.

In 1975, he was hired by Senator Richard Schweiker as a researcher for the Church Committee into the activities of U.S. intelligence agencies, and in 1977 he was hired as a researcher for the House of Representatives Select Committee on Assassinations (HSCA). According to The New York Times, Fonzi was recruited as an investigator for the HSCA "mainly on the strength of scathing magazine critiques he had written about the Warren Commission and its conclusion that Lee Harvey Oswald had acted alone in killing the president in Dallas on Nov. 22, 1963."

In his work for the HSCA, Fonzi focused on the role of Cuban exile groups and the links those groups had with the Central Intelligence Agency (CIA) and the Mafia. He obtained testimony from Antonio Veciana that the latter once saw his CIA contact, whom Fonzi established was David Atlee Phillips, conferring with Lee Harvey Oswald. In the course of Fonzi’s research, he attempted to interview Oswald's friend George de Mohrenschildt on March 31, 1977; hours later, de Mohrenschildt was dead, an apparent suicide.

In 1980, Fonzi published an article in The Washingtonian on the JFK assassination. The article aroused enough interest from the CIA for it to investigate whether Fonzi had breached his 1978 non-disclosure agreement with the CIA, which he had signed in order to gain access to classified files (it concluded that Fonzi had not). The article later formed the basis for his 1993 book, The Last Investigation. In 2012, The New York Times said of The Last Investigation that "historians and researchers consider Mr. Fonzi's book among the best of the roughly 600 published on the Kennedy assassination, and credit him with raising doubts about the government’s willingness to share everything it knew."

He was interviewed for the 1988 Jack Anderson documentary American Expose: Who Killed JFK?.

== Publications ==
=== Books ===
- Annenberg: A Biography of Power. New York: Weybright and Talley (1970). OCLC 1148031447.
  - UK edition: Annenberg: Ambassador Extraordinary. London: Blond (1979).
- The Last Investigation. New York: Thunder's Mouth Press (1993). OCLC 1256252357.
  - Later editions include a foreword by Marie Fonzi (2013) and afterword by Dick Russell (2018).

=== Articles ===
- "This Town for Hire." Philadelphia (1968), pp. 52-63. Photos by Francis Laping. OCLC 44025885.
- "Plutocrats at Sea: The Robber Barons Could Teach Today's Tycoons about Shipping Out in Style," with Christopher Gray. Avenue (1990).

=== Pamphlets ===
- City Planning's Tweedy Boss (1960)
