= Permindex =

Holding company in Basel, Switzerland

- Formation: 1958, Switzerland
- Purpose: Trade
- Headquarters: Basel, Switzerland

Permindex, also referred to as Permanent Industrial Exposition or Permanent Industrial Expositions, was a trade organization headquartered in Basel, Switzerland. Allegations that Permindex was a front organization for the Central Intelligence Agency have been advanced by advocates of some John F. Kennedy assassination conspiracy theories.

== History ==
Permindex was described as a holding company built with Canadian, Italian, Swiss, and United States capital. As of 1960, it had 20 stockholders. In 1959, former Prime Minister of Hungary Ferenc Nagy, said to be the president of Permindex, outlined the group's plans to build "Europe's first international shopping centre for businessmen" within the previously unfinished Esposizione Universale Roma. Permindex occupied 400,000 square feet within the four "palaces" under a nine-year lease with another nine-year option. The project was modeled after and designed to compete with the International Trade Mart in New Orleans. The centre opened on January 16, 1960.

== Allegations ==
Businessman Clay Shaw, head of the International Trade Mart in New Orleans, represented the United States on the board of directors for Permindex. On March 1, 1967, Shaw was arrested and charged with conspiring to assassinate President John F. Kennedy by New Orleans District Attorney Jim Garrison. Three days later on March 4, the Italian left-wing newspaper Paese Sera published a story alleging that Shaw was linked to the CIA through his involvement in the Centro Mondiale Commerciale, a subsidiary of Permindex in which Shaw was also said to be a board member. According to Paese Sera, the CMC had been a front organization developed by the CIA for transferring funds to Italy for "illegal political-espionage activities" and had attempted to depose French President Charles de Gaulle in the early 1960s. On March 6, the newspaper printed other allegations about individuals it said were connected to Permindex, including Louis Bloomfield whom it described as "an American agent who now plays the role of a businessman from Canada (who) established secret ties in Rome with Deputies of the Christian Democrats and neo-Fascist parties." The allegations were retold in various newspapers associated with the Communist parties in Italy (l'Unità), France (L'Humanité), and the Soviet Union (Pravda), as well as leftist papers in Canada and Greece, prior to reaching the American press eight weeks later. American journalist Max Holland stated that Paese Sera's allegations connecting Shaw to the CIA eventually led to Garrison implicating the CIA in a conspiracy to assassinate Kennedy.

After his acquittal, Shaw explained his position with the organization in an interview published in Penthouse: "I didn't mind being on their board, although there was no money involved, but I would have to go to Rome annually for the board meetings and my way would be paid, so why not?" According to Holland, an internal investigation by the CIA's counterintelligence staff found that Clay Shaw had volunteered information to the agency's Domestic Contact Service from 1948 to 1956, but that the substance of the allegations were not true. It concluded that neither Permindex nor Centro Mondiale Commerciale were a front to channel funds to anti-communists, and that the agency had not solicited Shaw to use his relationship with CMC for clandestine purposes.
