= Miami Monthly =

US magazine

- Categories: Regional magazine
- Frequency: Monthly
- Format: Print
- Country: US
- Based in: Florida
- Language: English
- Website: http://miamimonthlymagazine.com

Miami Monthly was a Southeast Florida's city/regional magazine, publishing news and information on the people, politics, life, culture and style of the greater Miami area.

== History ==
Miami Monthly evolved from a family of community publications founded in 1997 by publisher Elena V. Carpenter. Appearing first as tabloid-size newspapers, the Coconut Grove Times, Brickell Post and South Miami Times grew into glossy city magazines.

The archived website for the Miami Monthly features archived content from 2010, from before it closed. There are also Miami Monthly prints from 2009 for sale on eBay.

== Editorial content ==
In July 2007, Miami Monthly broke the story of an organized group of City of Miami employees who participated in an underground business known as The Firm. "Robbing the City Blind" described how members of the Capital Improvements Department spent many hours each day working on their secret clients using city computers, vehicles and other equipment. A dozen initial arrests included charges ranging from organized racketeering to grand theft and fraud.

== See also ==
- John Dufresne
