= David Atlee Phillips =

Central Intelligence Agency officer (1922–1988)

David Atlee Phillips (October 31, 1922 – July 7, 1988) was an American Central Intelligence Agency officer of 25 years and a recipient of the Career Intelligence Medal. Phillips rose to become the CIA's chief of operations for the Western Hemisphere. In 1975, he founded the Association of Former Intelligence Officers (AFIO), an alumni association comprising intelligence officers from all services.

Phillips was repeatedly accused of involvement in the JFK assassination. He was named by assassination researchers and even by family members of another Agency operative. The House Select Committee on Assassinations (HSCA) investigated a claim made by Cuban exile Antonio Veciana that Phillips (while using an alias) was meeting with Lee Harvey Oswald in the months prior to November 1963. In 1980, Donald Freed and Fred Landis published a book accusing Phillips of being Oswald’s case officer, and of having a hand in the 1976 assassination of Chilean diplomat Orlando Letelier. Phillips sued them for libel. In 1986, they settled for an undisclosed amount and retracted the allegations.

== Biography ==
=== Early life and war service ===
Phillips was born in Fort Worth, Texas. He attended the College of William and Mary in Williamsburg, Virginia from 1940 to 1941, and Texas Christian University in Fort Worth from 1941 to 1942. He started out with hopes of becoming a professional actor on the New York stage, but his acting career was put on hold by World War II.

In 1943, Phillips enlisted in the U.S. Army Air Corps, attaining the rank of sergeant and serving as a nose gunner on a bomber crew. During a mission over Austria, his plane was shot down, and he was captured by German forces. After spending a year in a prisoner-of-war camp, he was able to escape and make his way back to Allied lines. At the conclusion of the war in 1945, he was awarded a Purple Heart and an Air Medal.

Phillips resumed his acting career, and also worked as a playwright and a radio announcer. Next, he moved to Chile where he continued to write. In 1948, he attended the University of Chile.

=== CIA career ===
In 1950, Phillips joined the CIA as a part-time contract agent in Chile, where he owned and edited The South Pacific Mail, an English-language newspaper that circulated throughout South America and several islands in the Pacific. The CIA initially paid him a $50-a-month retainer. One of his first assignments was to pose as a high-level U.S. intelligence agent who might be interested in defecting. He recalled in a 1975 interview: "I was to be a 'dangle'. Sure enough, a KGB agent soon began to cultivate me."

He became a full-time CIA operative in 1954, working as E. Howard Hunt's deputy in the major psychological warfare effort in Guatemala during the U.S. coup and its aftermath. In the weeks prior to the coup, Phillips received praise within the CIA for creating a radio disinformation campaign to encourage defections within the Guatemalan military, and to create an impression among the populace that "rebels were everywhere in Guatemala" and that the Liberation forces were arriving imminently. For this he received a Distinguished Intelligence Medal.

He attempted a similar radio campaign in the first years of Fidel Castro's rule by broadcasting from tiny Swan Island between the Honduran and Cuban coasts. Phillips reportedly coined the phrase, "Castro betrayed the revolution", which was a key part of the messaging used by the anti-Castro movement. Phillips assisted in planning the ill-fated Bay of Pigs Invasion of Cuba in April 1961. In his memoir Phillips says that on finding out about the failure of the invasion, he got drunk, cried for hours, and threw up multiple times. Throughout the 1960s, he was believed to be an important member of the CIA's top-secret counterintelligence group, code-named Operation 40, that sought to destabilize the Castro regime.

Phillips' years in the CIA also included undercover assignments in Mexico City and Beirut. He rose steadily through the ranks to intelligence officer, chief of station, and eventually chief of Western Hemisphere operations, serving primarily in Latin America, with a focus on Cuba, Brazil, and the Dominican Republic. He retired from the agency in 1975 and founded the Association of Retired Intelligence Officers (ARIO) (it was later renamed the Association of Former Intelligence Officers or AFIO). In March 1978, Phillips and Gordon McLendon approached CIA Director Stansfield Turner about the idea of a CIA television show. They were disillusioned with the negative portrayal of the agency such as in the film Three Days of the Condor. However nothing came of the proposal.

=== House Select Committee on Assassinations ===
While investigating Lee Harvey Oswald's possible ties to pro- and anti-Castro radical groups prior to the assassination of President John F. Kennedy, an HSCA staff investigator, Gaeton Fonzi, reported hearing a significant anecdote from Antonio Veciana, founder of the anti-Castro paramilitary organization Alpha 66. The latter said his organization's training, funding and planning had been handled by an intelligence agent he knew as "Maurice Bishop". Veciana recalled a meeting with Bishop in a downtown office building in Dallas, Texas in early September 1963. When Veciana arrived at the meeting, he saw Bishop in a corner of the lobby talking to a "pale, slight" young man. The three of them exited the lobby, and Bishop and the young man continued talking out on the sidewalk. Then the young man gestured farewell to Bishop and walked away. On the day of the JFK assassination, Veciana immediately recognized the news photographs and TV images of Lee Harvey Oswald as being the same young man he saw that day with Bishop in downtown Dallas.

After a former CIA officer, who had worked with Phillips at the JM/WAVE station south of Miami, told investigators that Phillips sometimes used the "Bishop" alias, the HSCA subpoenaed Veciana to testify about Phillips as "Bishop". Gaeton Fonzi and Church Committee Senator Richard Schweiker were convinced that Phillips and Bishop were one and the same, but Veciana would not confirm it when shown photos of Phillips. In his HSCA testimony, Veciana stated under oath that Phillips was not Bishop although they bore a "physical similarity". Veciana also spoke of Bishop's efforts to portray Oswald as a communist with ties to Cuba. After Veciana mentioned he had a relative who was a high-ranking officer in Castro's intelligence service in Mexico City, Bishop offered to pay the relative a large sum to claim publicly he had met with Oswald in the Mexican capital.

On April 25, 1978, Phillips testified before the HSCA, and he denied ever using the name Maurice Bishop. He insisted he had never encountered Veciana until a recent meeting arranged by Sen. Schweiker's office. Then, years later at a 2014 conference entitled "The Warren Report and the JFK Assassination: Five Decades of Significant Disclosures", Veciana reversed his HSCA statements and asserted unequivocally, albeit not under oath, that he believed the agent he knew as Bishop was in fact David Atlee Phillips. Veciana repeated the assertion in his 2017 book, Trained to Kill.

=== Conspiracy allegations and lawsuit ===
In their 1980 book Death in Washington, authors Donald Freed and Fred Landis charged that the CIA was involved in the 1973 Chilean coup d'état and the 1976 assassination of Orlando Letelier in Washington, D.C. The authors specifically named Phillips as participating in a coverup of the Letelier assassination, and reiterated Gaeton Fonzi's claim that Phillips served as Oswald's case officer while using the alias "Maurice Bishop". In 1982, Phillips and the AFIO brought a $230 million libel suit against Freed, Landis, and their publisher. A settlement was reached in 1986 with Phillips receiving a retraction and an undisclosed amount of money. He donated some of the proceeds to the AFIO for the purpose of creating a legal defense fund for American intelligence officers who felt they were victims of libel. In the aftermath of the lawsuit, Phillips wrote an article in Columbia Journalism Review questioning journalistic due process.

Following the death of former CIA agent and Watergate figure E. Howard Hunt in 2007, two of his sons, Saint John Hunt and David Hunt, revealed that their father had recorded several "deathbed" admissions about himself and others being involved in a conspiracy to assassinate John F. Kennedy. In the April 5, 2007 issue of Rolling Stone, Saint John Hunt detailed a number of individuals implicated by his father, including David Atlee Phillips along with Lyndon B. Johnson, Cord Meyer, David Sánchez Morales, Frank Sturgis, William Harvey and an assassin he termed "French gunman grassy knoll" who many presume was Lucien Sarti. The two sons further alleged that their father deleted the controversial information from his autobiography, American Spy: My Secret History in the CIA, Watergate and Beyond, in order to avoid possible perjury charges. Hunt's widow and other children told the Los Angeles Times that the two sons had taken advantage of their ailing father’s loss of lucidity by coaching and exploiting him for financial gain. The newspaper said it examined the materials offered by the sons to support the story and found them to be "inconclusive."

=== Later years ===
Phillips wrote and lectured frequently on intelligence matters. He authored numerous books, among them his CIA memoir The Night Watch, plus Careers in Secret Operations: How to Be a Federal Intelligence Officer, The Terror Brigade, The Carlos Contract, The Great Texas Murder Trials: A Compelling Account of the Sensational T. Cullen Davis Case, Secret Wars Diary: My Adventures in Combat Espionage Operations and Covert Action, and Writing For Pleasure and Profit in Retirement: How to Enjoy a Second Career as a Professional Writer.

He also compiled the David Atlee Phillips Papers, 1929-1989 and had his wife submit them to the Library of Congress after his death. These papers include manuscripts, correspondence, drafts of books, articles and other material relating to Phillips' career.

=== Personal life ===
Phillips was the brother of writer James Atlee Phillips and the uncle of musician Shawn Phillips.

In 1948, he married Helen Hausman Haasch. They had four children, then divorced in 1967.

In 1969, he married Virginia Pederson Simmons who had three children from a previous marriage. The couple had one child together.

=== Death ===
Phillips died at his home in Bethesda, Maryland from complications of cancer on July 7, 1988, at the age of 65. He was buried in Arlington National Cemetery.

== Publications ==
=== Books ===
- The Night Watch: 25 Years of Peculiar Service. New York: Atheneum (1977). ISBN 0689107544. OCLC 2424448.
- The Carlos Contract: A Novel of International Terrorism. New York: Macmillan (1978). ISBN 0025961101. OCLC 4135781.
- The Great Texas Murder Trials: A Compelling Account of the Sensational T. Cullen Davis Case. New York: Macmillan (1979). ISBN 0025961500. OCLC 4907946.
- Careers in Secret Operations: How to be a Federal Intelligence Officer. Frederick, MD: University Publications of America (1984). ISBN 0890936536. OCLC 11316169.
- Writing for Pleasure and Profit in Retirement: How to Enjoy a Second Career as a Professional Writer. Bethesda, MD: Stone Trail Press (1986). ISBN 978-0932123015. OCLC 15354518.
- The Terror Brigade (novel). New York: Berkeley Publishing Group (1989). ISBN 978-0515099096. OCLC 19099230.
- Secret Wars Diary: My Adventures in Combat, Espionage Operations and Covert Action. Bethesda, MD: Stone Trail Press (1988).ISBN 9780932123046. OCLC 20936502.

=== Legal proceedings ===
- Freed Donald v Phillips David Atlee. Civil Action No. 81-1407 & 81-2578.
  - Deposition (Mar. 25, 1983)
  - Deposition (Mar. 30, 1983)

== See also ==
- 1954 Guatemalan coup d'état
- Bay of Pigs Invasion
- Richard M. Bissell, Jr.
- Guillermo Hernández-Cartaya
- Operation 40
- Felix Rodriguez
- Antonio Veciana
- Gaeton Fonzi
- Porter Goss
