= Ana Veciana-Suarez =

American columnist (born 1956)

Ana Veciana-Suarez (born 1956 in Havana, Cuba) is an American syndicated columnist, author and former journalist. Her columns are distributed by Tribune Content Agency. She lives in Miami, Florida.

== Early life and education ==
Veciana-Suarez was born in Havana, Cuba. Her family migrated to the United States when she was six years old. Her father Antonio Veciana is a Cuban exile who was involved in several assassination attempts against Fidel Castro. In 2003, she pleaded guilty to a federal contempt- of court charge for not disclosing her father's criminal history during the jury selection for a federal civil trial. She was sentenced to 18 months of probation, ordered to serve 60 hours of community service, and fined $5,000.

Veciana-Suarez graduated summa cum laude from the University of South Florida. She has worked at The Miami News, The Palm Beach Post and most recently, The Miami Herald. For her journalism work, she was awarded a National Headliner, a Clarion Award, a Green Eyeshade and two Sunshine State Awards.

== Published works ==
- The Chin Kiss King (Plume, 1998). It was originally published in English by Farrar Strass Giroux in 1997. It was re-issued in 2015.
- Birthday Parties in Heaven (Plume, 2000)
- Flight to Freedom (Scholastic, 2002). It was reissued in 2016.

=== With the Media Institute ===
- Hispanic Media: Impact and Influence (1990)
- Hispanic Media, USA: A Narrative Guide to the Print and Electronic Hispanic News Media in the United States (1987)
