= Association of Former Intelligence Officers =

Association Of Former Intelligence Officers Inc
- Formation: Tax-exempt since August 1977; 48 years ago
- Founder: David Atlee Phillips; Gordon McLendon
- Headquarters: Herndon, Virginia
- Revenue: 426,388 USD (2023)
- Expenses: 373,441 USD (2023)
- Endowment: 2,045,021 USD (2023)
- Website: afio.com

The Association of Former Intelligence Officers (AFIO), formerly known as the Association of Retired Intelligence Officers is a non-profit, non-partisan advocacy organization founded in 1975 by David Atlee Phillips to counter widespread criticism of the United States intelligence community coming from the media and the U.S. Congress. It is registered with the IRS as a 501(c)(3) tax-exempt charity and sees its primary mission as educational. The AFIO has 5,000 members in 24 active chapters. Full membership is limited to current and former professional intelligence officers who served within the United States intelligence community. AFIO also offers an "associate" membership to the general public if one supports its principles and abides by its code of ethics.

Radio broadcaster Gordon McLendon was a co-founder of the AFIO.
