= Louis Bloomfield =

Canadian lawyer and businessman

- Born: Louis Mortimer Bloomfield; August 8, 1906; Westmount, Quebec, Canada
- Died: July 19, 1984 (aged 77); Jerusalem
- Education: McGill University; University of Montreal
- Occupations: Lawyer, businessman
- Board member of: Permindex
- Spouse: Justine Adelaide Stern

Louis Mortimer Bloomfield (August 8, 1906 – July 19, 1984), KStJ, QC, PhD, LLD, DCL, was a Canadian lawyer, businessman, and soldier. Bloomfield was recognized as a leader of the Canadian Jewish community. Proponents of some John F. Kennedy assassination conspiracy theories have alleged he was tied to the shooting through the Office of Strategic Services, the Central Intelligence Agency, and Permindex.

== Early life and family ==
Bloomfield was born August 8, 1906 Westmount, Quebec near Montreal, a city in which his Jewish family had roots since the early nineteenth century. He had a brother, Bernard, and three sisters, Dorothy, Florence, and Myrtle.

On February 16, 1969, he married Justine Adelaide Stern.

== Education ==
Bloomfield earned a Bachelor of Arts from McGill University in 1927 and a Master of Laws from the University of Montreal in 1930. He also received a Doctor of Laws from St. Francis Xavier University in 1964 and a Doctor of Civil Law from St. Thomas University in 1973.

== Legal career ==
Bloomfield was admitted to the Bar of Quebec in 1930 and practised international law with Phillips, Bloomfield, Vineberg, and Goodman from 1930 to 1970. Bloomfield assisted King Carol II of Romania in his attempt to gain entry into Canada after World War II, and was an executor of the Lady Davis estate. He was appointed a King's Counsel in 1948 and was elected to serve on the Mixed Court of Tangier (Tribunal Mixte Tangier) within the international zone of Tangier in 1949. In 1952, Bloomfield co-founded the Canadian branch of the International Law Association with Maxwell Cohen, Gerald F. FitzGerald, and Nicolas Mateesco-Matte. He served as that organization's president from 1964 to 1978, and was an honorary president from 1974 until his death in 1984. From 1968 to 1972, he was a council member of the American Society of International Law.

In the field of international law, Bloomfield was the author of many articles and reviews including contributions to the Canadian Bar Review, the Canadian Yearbook of International Law, and the American Journal of International Law. He was also the author of four books: The British Honduras-Guatemala Dispute (1953); Egypt, Israel and the Gulf of Aqaba in International Law (1967); Gründung und Aufbau kanadischer Aktiengesellschaften (1960); and La Convention de Varsovie dans une Optique Canadienne (1976).

== Military service ==
Bloomfield served in World War II with the Royal Canadian Army Service Corps and retired with the rank of major in 1946.

== Businessman ==
Bloomfield served as president of Heineken's Breweries of Canada. He was also named as a major shareholder in the Swiss company Permindex, a company alleged by advocates of some John F. Kennedy assassination conspiracy theories to be a front organization for the Central Intelligence Agency.

== Public service ==
Bloomfield was active in public service and described as "a pillar of a number of Montreal charities". He was president of the Quebec Council of St. John Ambulance, life governor for Montreal Children's Hospital and the Hôpital Ste Jeanne d'Arc, and vice-president and director of the Reddy Memorial Hospital in Westmount for fifty years. Bloomfiled was a co-founder and vice-president of World Wild Life Fund Canada, an executive member of the National Capital Commission from 1963 to 1976, and governor of the Loyola College Development Board. He served as a member of the Board of Governors of the America Israel Cultural Foundation, the Hebrew University, the Weizmann Institute of Science and the Technion Israel Institute of Technology. Bloomfield was also an Honorary Consul General for the Republic of Liberia from 1962 until his death.

=== Histadrut ===
Bloomfield was the Montreal Chairman of the Israel Histadrut Campaign. In 1967 was reported to have been active in the Histadrut, Israel's organization of trade unions, for over twenty years. According to The Canadian Jewish Chronicle, Bloomfield and his brother Bernard "played a decisive part in making the Histadrut one of the most respected and influential organizations" in Canada.

=== Eldee Foundation ===
Bloomfield was vice-president of the Eldee Foundation, a charitable foundation whose objective was "to contribute to and assist charitable organizations and institutions in Canada maintained for the benefit of person's of Jewish faith." Originally known as the Canada-Histadrut Foundation, it was established in 1961 by Henriette, Lady Davis, the divorced first wife of Sir Mortimer Davis. Lady Davis had enlisted the services of Bloomfield to negotiate the final settlement of her divorce trust with her ex-husband's estate. She contributed a large portion of the Eldee Foundation's initial capital of $30 million, and Bloomfield, his brother Bernard, and Abrham Shurem became directors of the foundation.

In 1971, it was reported to be one of the fifteen largest charitable foundations in Canada. According to The Financial Post, the market value of its assets were valued at $43.4 million in 1967 and $22 million in 1978. In 1972, Bloomfield and his brother established through the Eldee Foundation a named chair at the Weizmann Institute of Science, The Lady Davis Professorial Chair of Experimental Physics.

== Honors ==
Bloomfield was awarded numerous honors throughout his life. In 1967, he received the Histadrut Humanitarian Award at a dinner in his honor; Davie Fulton, a candidate in the 1967 Progressive Conservative leadership election, was among the guests and referred to Bloomfield as his "dear friend". He received the Knight of Justice of St. John, the Canadian Centennial Medal, and the Queen Elizabeth II Silver Jubilee Medal in 1977. Bloomfield also received honorary degrees from the Hebrew University in 1973 (Doctor of Philosophy) and Bar-Ilan University (doctorate) in July 1984, and was recognized as an honorary citizen in Tel Aviv and Winnipeg.

The Bloomfield Centre at St. Francis Xavier University, the Bloomfield Library for the Humanities and Social Sciences at the Hebrew University of Jerusalem, and Bloomfield Stadium in the Tel Aviv are named after Bloomfield and his brother, Bernard.

== Death ==
On July 19, 1984, Bloomfield died of a heart attack while in Jerusalem to receive the honorary degree from Bar-Ilan University.

== JFK assassination allegations ==
Proponents of some John F. Kennedy assassination conspiracy theories have alleged the Bloomfield was linked to the shooting through the Office of Strategic Services, the Central Intelligence Agency, and Permindex.

On March 4, 1967, the Italian left-wing newspaper Paese Sera published a story alleging that Clay Shaw, who was arrested and charged with conspiring to assassinate President John F. Kennedy by New Orleans District Attorney Jim Garrison three days earlier, was linked to the CIA through his involvement in the Centro Mondiale Commerciale, a subsidiary of Permindex in which Shaw was a board member. According to Paese Sera, the CMC had been a front organization developed by the CIA for transferring funds to Italy for "illegal political-espionage activities" and had attempted to depose French President Charles de Gaulle in the early 1960s. On March 6, the newspaper printed other allegations about individuals it said were connected to Permindex, including Bloomfield whom it described as "an American agent who now plays the role of a businessman from Canada (who) established secret ties in Rome with Deputies of the Christian Democrats and neo-Fascist parties."

According to Max Holland, an internal investigation by the CIA's counterintelligence staff found that the substance of Paese Sera's allegations were not true and that neither Permindex or Centro Mondiale Commerciale were a front to channel funds to anti-communists.

=== Donation of personal documents ===
Prior to his death, Bloomfield donated to the Library and Archives Canada 31 boxes of documents related to some of his notable clients and charity work, as well as correspondence with prominent politicians, including United States President George H. W. Bush. His donation came with the condition that the documents would not be made public until twenty years after his death. In 2004, Maurice Philipps, a JFK assassination conspiracy author, requested access to the Bloomfield Collection, but was told that Bloomfield's widow had extended the restriction on accessing the documents until 25 years after her death. Philipps challenged the decision, and a 2006 Federal Court ruling found that the Library and Archives Canada could not extend the restriction to access the documents past the original deadline set by Bloomfield himself.

According to Bloomfield's nephew, Harry Bloomfield, the restriction of access was contributing to unfounded conspiracy theories allegations that tied his uncle to the assassination of Kennedy. Philipps stated that he believed the documents in the collection did not implicate Bloomfield but that they might contain information related to the assassination.

== Works ==
- Egypt, Israel and the Gulf of Aqaba in International Law (1957)
- Crimes against internationally protected persons, prevention and punishment: An analysis of the UN convention (1975)
