= Antonio Veciana =

Cuban dissident and spy (1928–2020)

- Born: October 18, 1928
- Died: June 18, 2020 (aged 91)
- Military career
- Allegiance: Alpha 66

Antonio Veciana Blanch (October 18, 1928 – June 18, 2020) was a Cuban exile who became the founder and a leader of the anti-Castro paramilitary group Alpha 66.

In the mid-1970s, Veciana told the United States House Select Committee on Assassinations (HSCA) that a representative for the Central Intelligence Agency (CIA) he knew as Maurice Bishop directed him to organize Alpha 66 and helped plan many of the group's operations, including two assassination attempts on Fidel Castro. He also claimed that he met a man he later recognized to be Lee Harvey Oswald during a meeting with Bishop about two to three months prior to the assassination of United States President John F. Kennedy. The HSCA found that Veciana was involved or likely involved in the two assassination plots on Castro, but reported that it could not successfully "substantiate the existence of Bishop and his alleged relationship with Oswald".

== Career ==
At the time of the 1959 Cuban Revolution Veciana was employed as an accountant by Julio Lobo at the Banco Financiero, and was the President of the professional accountants' association.

Veciana said he was recruited as a spy for the CIA by David Atlee Phillips (also known as Maurice Bishop) in 1959 to kill Fidel Castro. After the initial contact with Bishop, Veciana took a 2-3 week course in psychological warfare and sabotage. After the failed Bay of Pigs Invasion in April 1961, Bishop directed Veciana to help organise an assassination attempt on Castro in Havana from an apartment rented in the name of Veciana's mother-in-law. Veciana left Cuba the day before the October 1961 attempt, his wife and children having already left some months earlier. The attempt, which involved a bazooka, failed.

=== 1960s, Alpha 66 ===
According to Veciana, he settled in Miami with his family, and after Bishop contacted him there, at Bishop's direction Veciana founded Alpha 66 in mid-1962, becoming its civilian chief and principal fundraiser, and recruiting its military chief from another Cuban exile organization. Alpha 66 became one of the most active Cuban exile groups, acquiring guns and boats and launching commando raids on Cuba.

According to the CIA Veciana received "large sums of money" from his former Banco Financiero employer Julio Lobo in 1962. He offered to commit $250,000 for future Alpha 66 attacks. Lobo vouched for Veciana with skeptical American government officials, telling Thomas C. Mann that he was "reliable". In January 1963 Veciana made a speech at a fundraising event in San Juan, Puerto Rico. He announced that Alpha 66 would lead a "war of liberation" and singled out the "pacifist" Kennedy administration which he said was seeking reproachment with the Cuban government. He cautioned against seeking aid from the US government as "useless" because "U.S. policy on the Cuban situation is not cooperative".

From August 1968 to June 1972 Veciana was active in Bolivia. Formally a banking adviser to the Central Bank of Bolivia on contracts financed by the U.S. Agency for International Development, his office was located in the passport division of the American Embassy, and his primary activity was organising anti-Communist and anti-Castro activities. This included another assassination attempt on Castro in Chile in 1971 involving a plan to put a gun inside a television camera. Veciana's recruiting of Cuban associates who prepared a plan to blame Russian agents for the assassination led to a falling-out with Bishop and the eventual termination of their relationship. When Bishop broke off the relationship in 1973, he paid Veciana $253,000 in recognition of his services; Veciana had previously refused payment.

=== 1970s, and HSCA interview ===
On July 24, 1973, Veciana was arrested in Miami on charges related to smuggling 25 kilograms of pure cocaine from Bolivia into the United States with two other co-conspirators who had also fled to Florida from Cuba after Castro came to power, Augustin Barres and Ariel Pomares. The indictment charged Veciana and Pomares with conspiracy to distribute narcotics and possess them with intent to distribute, and with the distribution of approximately seven kilograms of cocaine. Veciana was responsible for traveling to Bolivia, purchasing the drugs and delivering them to Bolivian diplomats who then smuggled them into the United States. On January 14, 1974, Veciana and Pomares were convicted on both counts after a five-day trial in the United States District Court for the Southern District of New York before US district judge Dudley Baldwin Bonsal. For his part, Veciana was sentenced to concurrent terms of imprisonment of seven years on each count, also to be followed by a special parole term of three years. He served 27 months, and continued to profess his innocence after his release.

In 1976 Veciana told the United States House Select Committee on Assassinations (HSCA) that at one meeting with Bishop in Dallas in late-August or September 1963 he had arrived to see Bishop talking with Lee Harvey Oswald. Veciana said that several months after the assassination Bishop had offered to pay a relative of Veciana who worked in the Cuban Intelligence Directorate in Mexico City to say publicly that he had met Oswald there.

On September 21, 1979, in Miami, Veciana was wounded in the head during a drive-by shooting while he was riding in his car. He was initially admitted to Pan American Hospital with a small-caliber bullet imbedded above his left ear, then transferred to Jackson Memorial Hospital. Veciana's family and friends said that agents of the Cuban government had attempted to kill him. Veciana was not active in Alpha 66 at the time of the shooting. His wife said he had received death threats eight months earlier, and Nazario Sargen, the then current leader of Alpha 66, said Veciana told a press conference a few months previously that the Cuban government was planning to kill him after he had learned about the plot from the United States Federal Bureau of Investigation.

== Later years ==
Veciana was briefly employed as treasurer by Maurice Ferré's 2004 campaign for mayor of Miami-Dade. He resigned after a few days, as he did not meet the state requirement of being a registered voter.

In 2013 Veciana gave interviews saying that he believed that the assassination of John F. Kennedy was carried out by senior military and intelligence officials. On January 16, 2016, the Assassination Archives and Research Center published a video on YouTube of a conference in which Veciana unequivocally stated that Maurice Bishop was in fact David Atlee Phillips. Veciana repeated this claim in Trained to Kill (2017), a book he co-authored with Carlos Harrison.

Veciana was the husband of Sira Muino and father of journalist Ana Veciana-Suarez.

In the years prior to his death, Veciana lived in an elder-care facility in Miami-Dade, Florida. He died in Miami on June 18, 2020, at age 91.

== Authored works ==
- (with Carlos Harrison) Trained to Kill: The Inside Story of CIA Plots Against Castro, Kennedy, and Che. Skyhorse Publishing. 2017. ISBN 978-1510713574.
