= Center for Democratic Renewal =

American political advocacy organization

- Abbreviation: CDR; previously NAKN
- Formation: 1979
- Founder: C. T. Vivian and Anne Braden
- Dissolved: 2008
- Type: NGO, political advocacy organization
- Headquarters: Atlanta, Georgia, U.S.
- Main organ: The Monitor
- Website: thecdr.org
- Formerly called: National Anti-Klan Network

The Center for Democratic Renewal (CDR), previously known as the National Anti-Klan Network (NAKN), was a progressive political advocacy organization based in Atlanta, Georgia. It was founded by civil rights activists C. T. Vivian and Anne Braden in 1979. Founded in response to that year's Greensboro massacre, in which several members of the Communist Workers' Party were killed by white supremacists, the group focused on combating the far right and white supremacy. The CDR monitored the far-right and published informational reports. It ceased activity in 2008.

== History ==
The organization was founded by the civil rights activists C. T. Vivian and Anne Braden. It was founded in 1979 as the National Anti-Klan Network (NAKN). This came after the Greensboro massacre that year, when, during a "Death to the Klan" march on November 3, 1979, several members of the Communist Workers' Party (CWP) were killed during a shootout with several Ku Klux Klan members and neo-Nazis. In the aftermath many were concerned with a rise in white supremacist violence; the group was founded in response to the event shortly after. NAKN evolved into a coalition of 60 different civil rights groups.

In its early years it primarily counter-protested against the far right, though this ceased to be a primarily organizational activity in later years. Many of its staffers and high-ranking figures had previous involvement in Marxist-Leninist or otherwise leftist backgrounds. Members of the communist organization the Sojourner Truth Organization were heavily involved in establishing NAKN. However, communist groups distrusted NAKN; in 1982, the Trotskyist Spartacist League/U.S. criticized NAKN, describing it in their journal Workers Vanguard as "a loose coalition of the remnants of the pro-Peking Stalinists of Mike Klonsky/Lyn Wells disintegrating 'Communist Party Marxist Leninist'" and as an "'alternative' to the communists".

In 1985, NAKN was renamed the Center for Democratic Renewal (CDR) in order to better reflect the organization's increasingly broad focus on progressive activism. In 1986, after one of the CDR's members infiltrated a far-right meeting, the CDR member got into a confrontation with a Klansman in a parking lot in Marietta, Georgia; the Klansman was charged with assault, but was acquitted. The next year, the CDR helped organize marches in Forsyth County, Georgia.

Following a spate of southern church burnings targeting black churches, the CDR founded National Coalition of Burned Churches in an effort to call for federal investigation. Following the September 11 attacks in 2001, the CDR opposed many of the efforts to regulate movement from and into the United States, arguing it was a scheme to criminalize immigrants. The CDR dissolved in 2008.

== Purpose and activities ==
Based in Atlanta, Georgia, the CDR primarily focused on surveilling and countering the far-right but also advocated for progressive and left-wing causes more broadly. It advocated anti-hate crime laws, and advocated for immigrants, reproductive rights, and for reducing poverty. It described itself as "the principle national clearinghouse for community-based efforts to counter hate group activity". Scholar John Walsh described its purpose as "advanc[ing] a vision of a democratic, diverse, and just society that is free from racism and bigotry". It published a newsletter, The Monitor. In addition to its main base in Atlanta, it had satellite offices in Seattle and Kansas City, Missouri. A 1989 article in the newspaper The Atlanta Journal said they had a "bunker mentality", writing that "they operate in quasi-secrecy out of a basement in a southwest Atlanta office building. They won't give out the street address. They use real names and pseudonyms interchangeably and have unlisted home phone numbers."

The CDR monitored far-right and other white supremacist groups and published a number of informational reports on white supremacy and racism. It infiltrated far-right meetings. A major publication of the CDR was When Hate Groups Come to Town: A Manual of Effective Community Responses, a book that focused on practical tactics to fight against racism. The CDR collaborated with a number of religious and civil organizations in pursuing its goals, including the American Presbyterian Church, the American Friends Service Committee, the Unitarian Universalist Church, and the National Council of Churches, among other groups. The CDR opposed the white supremacist Christian Identity theology.

They had a Southern Action Project, which established the National Southern Coalition Against Racism and Bigotry; this had 80 participating groups. It was associated with the British antifascist magazine Searchlight. C. T. Vivian was chairman in its early days. Lyn Wells was its national coordinator, later its executive director, and civil rights activist Joseph Lowery was also a director of the group; Marilyn Clement, Jean Hardisty, and Randall Williams were on NAKN's board of directors. Leonard Zeskind was director of research. Lynora Williams also later became executive director. Daniel Levitas was the executive director of the CDR for a time.

It was modestly funded compared to other similar watchdog organizations; in 2000, the groups' assets were reported at $102,290, with an annual income of $542,282. In 1989 its annual budget was $300,000, supported mostly from grants and through selling its materials. It was one of a set of NGOs devoted to surveilling the American far-right, including the Southern Poverty Law Center (SPLC), Anti-Defamation League (ADL), Simon Wiesenthal Center, American Jewish Committee (AJC), and Political Research Associates (PRA). Compared to these groups it was smaller in size; Michael classified them as a "second-level watchdog". Scholar Jeffrey Kaplan argued that it, alongside the smaller political watchdog organizations, served to "support and magnify the work of the ADL". CDR associate Chris Freeman said they aimed to be more engaged in the community than other watchdog organizations.

The CDR and PRA were, unlike groups like the ADL and the AJC, focused on progressive issues more broadly, and argued that the CDR had a less direct relationship with law enforcement and federal agencies than the SPLC and ADL. He described it as "one of the most prominent of the progressive-oriented watchdog groups", which unlike the other watchdog organizations were critical of the right-wing generally, not only political extremism. The CDR worked closely with PRA, and occasionally with groups like the ADL, though their relationship with the ADL was sometimes contentious due to the CDR's more left-wing stance. Kaplan argued its approach in combating the far right was similar to that of Marxist groups.

== Reception and influence ==
The CDR's lobbying led to the inclusion of sexual orientation in the Hate Crime Statistics Act of 1990. A 2000 report by the CDR led to the passage of Georgia's first hate crime laws. Their book When Hate Groups Come to Town: A Manual of Effective Community Responses encountered widespread use to stem racist recruiting, and CDR's materials were widely utilized. The CDR's involvement in left-wing politics brought it criticism, particularly the involvement of several of its staffers in Marxist-Leninist organizations. Scholar John Walsh wrote in 2006 that "people with various types of political motivation have sought to besmirch the reputation of the CDR, claiming that its research has been falsified, is itself politically motivated, and is even a hoax [...] the debate as to where acceptable political beliefs shade into unacceptable bigotry is still being contested." Walsh praised their anti-hate activities and activism.

According to historian George Michael, it was criticized for apparently "expos[ing] right-wing extremists while tending to obscure its own left-wing background to achieve greater respectability". Researcher of extremism Laird Wilcox criticized them for what he described as a "links and ties" approach of guilt by association. He found this hypocritical in light of what he considered the CDR's own "links and ties" to far-left groups; he accused the CDR of being "so thoroughly compromised by a hard-left agenda that they might reasonably be considered representatives of the opposing extreme". The Anti-Defamation League also criticized the CDR for its political agenda. The ADL Southern counsel Charles Wittenstein said in 1989 that the CDR "have a left-wing political agenda that we don't have" and that the ADL doesn't "have a working relationship with [the CDR]"; in turn the CDR claimed the ADL "consistently redbaited" them, and criticized them for letting conflicts happen rather than stepping in. Wilcox criticized the CDR for allegedly "encourag[ing] potentially violent confrontations", in contrast to groups like the ADL and SPLC, which he said avoided this. In an op-ed for The Wall Street Journal in 1996, American journalist and former civil rights attorney Michael Fumento criticized the CDR for their claims of an anti-black church-burning epidemic, saying that many of the burnings were found to not be arson or were committed by black perpetrators.

Walsh argued that under the George W. Bush administration, the CDR itself became seen as extremist in the mainstream media due to the "locus of acceptable political debate" moving to the right. CDR associate Chris Freeman denied that the organization was far-left, considering the group to be "pretty much a mainstream liberal kind of organization", though described himself as far-left and conceded their early politics may have been radical. He argued this was relegated to the early days of the organization as the NAKN.
