= Chip Berlet =

American journalist and analyst (1949–2026)

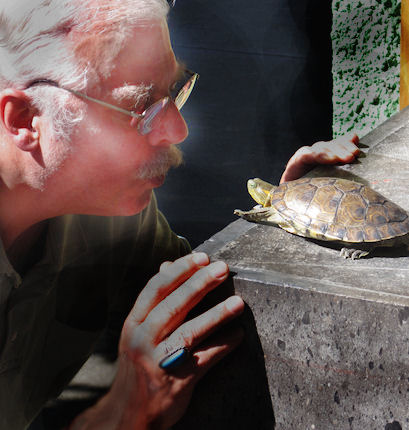
- Berlet in 2012
- Born: John Foster Berlet; November 22, 1949
- Died: January 30, 2026 (aged 76); Salem, Massachusetts, U.S.
- Occupations: Policy analyst, investigative journalist, photojournalist
- Known for: Study of right-wing movements and conspiracy theories

John Foster "Chip" Berlet (/bɜːrˈleɪ/; November 22, 1949 – January 30, 2026) was an American investigative journalist, research analyst, photojournalist, scholar, and activist specializing in the study of extreme right-wing movements in the United States. He also studied the spread of conspiracy theories. Starting with the 1995 Oklahoma City bombing, Berlet regularly appeared in the media to discuss extremist news stories. He was a senior analyst at Political Research Associates (PRA), a non-profit group that tracks right-wing networks.

Berlet, a paralegal, was a vice-president of the National Lawyers Guild. He served on the advisory board of the Center for Millennial Studies at Boston University, and for over 20 years was on the board of the Defending Dissent Foundation. In 1982, he was a Mencken Awards finalist in the best news story category for "War on Drugs: The Strange Story of Lyndon LaRouche", which was published in High Times. He served on the advisory board of the Campaign to Defend the Constitution.

== Background ==
Berlet attended the University of Denver for three years, where he majored in sociology with a minor in journalism. A member of the 1960s student left, he dropped out of the university in 1971 to work as an alternative journalist without completing his degree. In the mid-1970s, he went on to co-edit a series of books on student activism for the National Student Association and National Student Educational Fund. He also became an active shop steward with the National Lawyers' Guild.

During the late 1970s, he became the Washington, D.C., bureau chief of High Times magazine, and in 1979, he helped to organize citizens' hearings on FBI surveillance practices. From then until 1982, he worked as a paralegal investigator at the Better Government Association in Chicago, conducting research for an American Civil Liberties Union case, involving police surveillance by the Chicago police (which became known as the "Chicago Red Squad" case). He also worked on cases filed against the FBI or police on behalf of the Spanish Action Committee of Chicago (S.A.C.C.), the National Lawyers Guild, the American Indian Movement, Socialist Workers Party, the Christic Institute, and the American Friends Service Committee (a Quaker group). He was a founder member of the Chicago Area Friends of Albania, leaving the organization when he relocated to Boston in 1987.

Along with journalist Russ Bellant, Berlet wrote about Lyndon LaRouche's National Caucus of Labor Committees, calling it anti-Jewish and neo-Nazi, and urging an investigation of alleged illegal activities. In 1982, Berlet joined Political Research Associates, and in 1985 he founded the Public Eye BBS, the first computer bulletin board aimed at challenging the spread of white-supremacist and neo-Nazi material through electronic media, and the first to provide an online application kit for requesting information under the U.S. Freedom of Information Act. He was one of the first researchers to have drawn attention to the efforts by white supremacist and antisemitic groups to recruit farmers in the Midwestern United States in the 1970s and 1980s. Berlet was originally on the board of advisers of Public Information Research, founded by Daniel Brandt. Between 1990 and 1992, three members of Brandt's PIR advisory board, including Berlet, resigned over issues concerning another board member, L. Fletcher Prouty and Prouty's book The Secret Team. Berlet discussed this in a study titled "Right-Woos Left".

In 1996, he acted as an adviser on the Public Broadcasting Service documentary mini-series With God on Our Side: The Rise of the Religious Right in America, which was later published as a book by William Martin. Berlet criticized Ralph Nader and his associates for a close working relationship with Republican textile magnate Roger Milliken, erstwhile major backer of the 1996 presidential campaign of Pat Buchanan, and anti-unionization stalwart. Berlet provided research assistance to a campaign run by the mother of Jeremiah Duggan, a British student who died in disputed circumstances near Wiesbaden, Germany, and to reopen the investigation into his death.

== Photojournalism ==
As a photojournalist, Berlet's photographs, particularly of Ku Klux Klan and neo-Nazi rallies, have been carried on the Associated Press wire, have appeared on book and magazine covers, album covers and posters, and have been published in The Denver Post, The Washington Star, and The Chronicle of Higher Education.

== Reception ==
Berlet's second book, co-authored with Matthew N. Lyons, is Right-Wing Populism in America: Too Close for Comfort, was published by The Guilford Press in 2000. It is a broad historical overview of right-wing populism in the United States. The book received generally favorable reviews. Library Journal said it was a "detailed historical examination" that "strikes an excellent balance between narrative and theory." The New York Review of Books described it as an excellent account describing the outermost fringes of American conservatism. A review by Jerome Himmelstein in the journal Contemporary Sociology said that "it offers more than a scholarly treatise on the activities of the Third Reich", that it provides a background to help the reader understand the Holocaust, and that it "merits close attention from scholars of the political right in America and of social movements generally."

Robert H. Churchill of the private University of Hartford criticized Berlet and other authors writing about the right-wing as lacking breadth and depth in their analysis. In Who Watches the Watchmen?, Laird Wilcox criticized Berlet and other writers for what Wilcox says is their use of a technique he describes as "Links and Ties," which he says is a form of guilt by association. Jack Z. Bratich, an associate professor in the Journalism and Media Studies Department at Rutgers University, said that Berlet uses the methods of conspiracy theorists.

== Death ==
Chip Berlet died from leukemia at home in Salem, Massachusetts, on January 30, 2026, at the age of 76.

== Bibliography ==
- Clouds Blur the Rainbow: The Other Side of New Alliance Party. Political Research Associates, June 1987. ISBN 0915987031, ISBN 978-0915987030. Full text available.
- Eyes Right! Challenging the Right Wing Backlash. Boston, Massachusetts: South End Press, 1995. ISBN 0896085236. ISBN 978-0896085237. OCLC 60282135. 398 pp.
- Right-Wing Populism in America: Too Close for Comfort. Co-authored by Matthew N. Lyons. Edited by Douglas Kellner. New York: Guilford Press, 2000. ISBN 1462537618. ISBN 978-1572305687. OCLC 1028951306. 498 pp.
- Toxic to Democracy: Conspiracy Theories, Demonization & Scapegoating. Political Research Associates, June 2009. ISBN 9780915987214.
- Up in Arms: A Guide to Oregon’s Patriot Movement. Spencer Sunshine with Rural Organizing Project and Political Research Associates, 2016. ISBN 9780915987320.
- Trumping Democracy: From Reagan to the Alt-Right. Routledge, 2019. ISBN 9781138212497.

== See also ==
- Religious right in the United States
