= John Carmichael (Scientology) =

American Scientology official (born 1947)

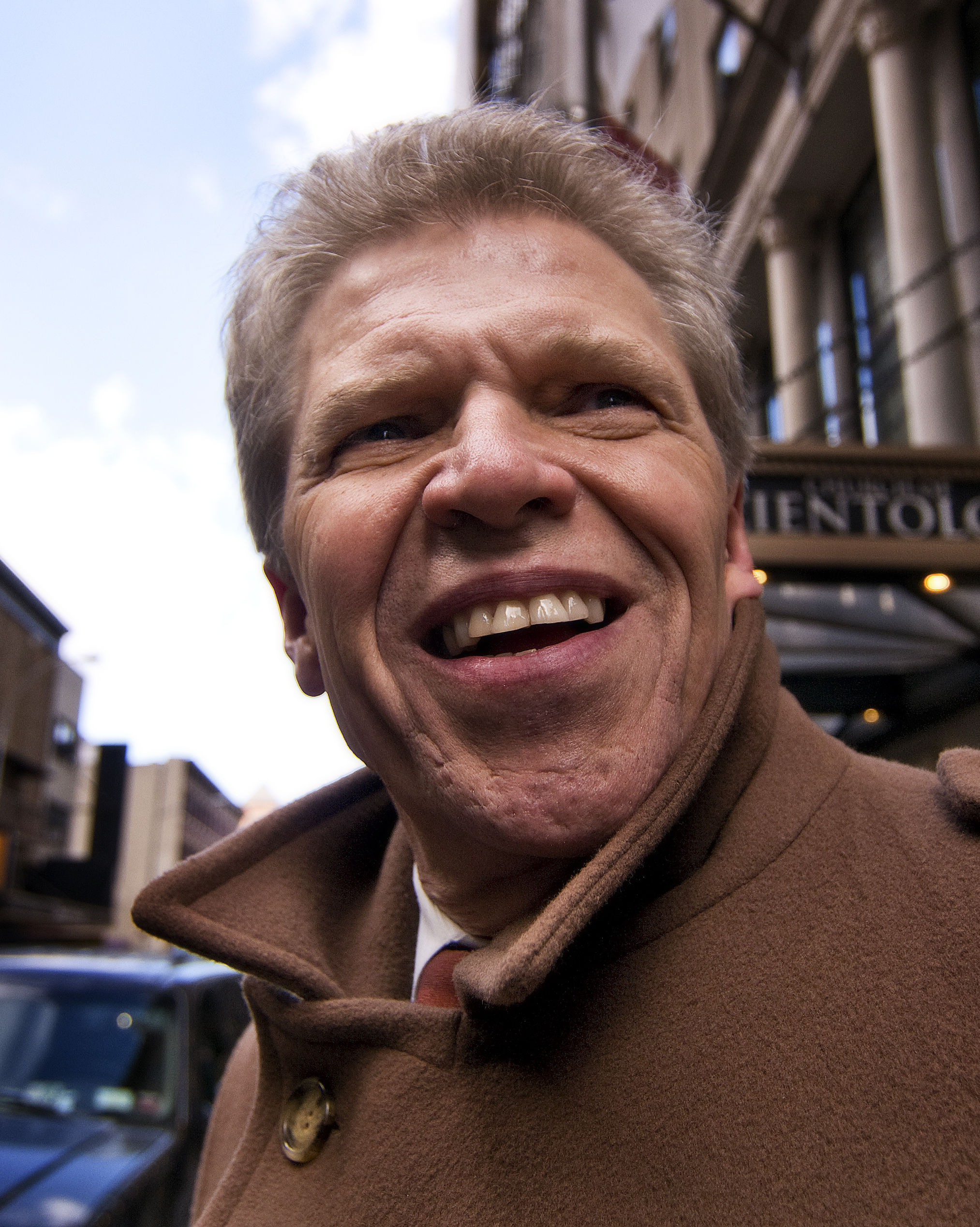
- Carmichael in 2008
- Born: 1947 (age 78–79); United States
- Employer: Church of Scientology International
- Children: 1

John Carmichael (born 1947) is an American Scientology official who has served as the president of the Church of Scientology of New York since 1987.

Carmichael was born a Presbyterian but became involved in Scientology after reading the book Dianetics: The Modern Science of Mental Health while attending Cornell University. He became an ordained minister with the Church of Scientology in 1973, and in 1985 he headed the organization's operations in the state of Oregon.

Since 1987, he has been the president of the Church of Scientology of New York. In 1993, Carmichael was New York contributing editor to the Church of Scientology's publication: Freedom Magazine. Carmichael supervised the efforts of the Church of Scientology's Volunteer Ministers group at Ground Zero after 9/11. In 2002 he received the Church of Scientology's "IAS Freedom Medal". He is the public affairs director for the Church of Scientology in New York. In 2006, he represented 12 Scientology organizations in New Jersey and New York.

== Biography ==
=== Early work in Scientology ===
Carmichael was born in 1947 as a Presbyterian, and grew up in Florida and Illinois. Having become an atheist, he began to learn about Scientology after reading Dianetics: The Modern Science of Mental Health while attending college at Cornell University.

He became an ordained minister with the Church of Scientology in 1973 and says he has devoted "half his life to the religion" because "it works". In 1985, he was president of the Scientology mission in Portland, Oregon, and also head of the Church of Scientology's operations in the state of Oregon.

=== President of the Church of Scientology of New York ===
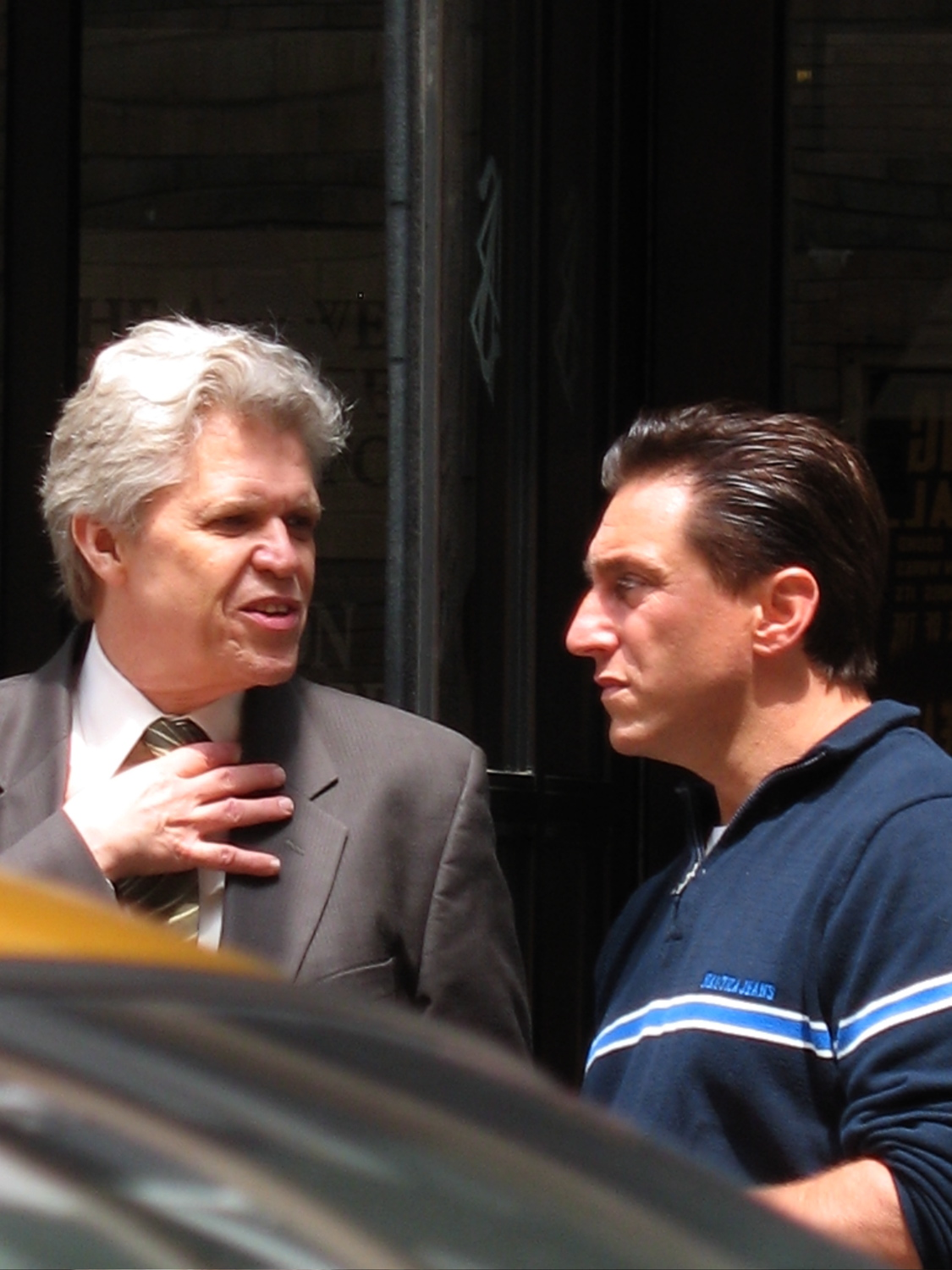
Carmichael (left) in New York City, 2008

Carmichael has served as the president of the Church of Scientology of New York since 1987, and has performed work for the Church of Scientology in San Francisco, California, Paris, France, and Munich, Germany. He serves as the Church of Scientology's New York public affairs director, representing 12 Scientology organizations in New Jersey and New York in 2006, and is a regional spokesperson for Scientology. In 1993 Carmichael was New York contributing editor to the Church of Scientology's publication: Freedom Magazine.

Carmichael oversaw efforts of the Church of Scientology's Volunteer Ministers group at Ground Zero after 9/11. "The overall purpose of Scientology is to create a better world. By getting volunteers out in the community, helping individuals one-on-one, that's one way we can do it," said Carmichael in an interview with The Journal News about the Church of Scientology's activities at Ground Zero. He appeared on a special Fox News program "Attack on America" on September 16, 2001, explaining to correspondent Rick Leventhal activities of members of the Church of Scientology at the Ground Zero work site.

In 2002, Carmichael was recognized for his efforts by being named as a recipient of the International Association of Scientologists Freedom Medal. In 2006, Carmichael heard about a musical which was in production in New York City which parodied Scientology called: A Very Merry Unauthorized Children's Scientology Pageant. He showed up unannounced at a rehearsal of the play to complain, and also sent a letter of complaint to Kyle Jarrow, the play's author.

In November 2007, Carmichael was one of a group of Scientologists invited by Tom Cruise to attend a private screening of the film Lions for Lambs, along with other stars of the film and their guests. In May 2008 Carmichael was involved in an altercation with anti-Scientology protesters near a Church of Scientology building in New York City.
