= JFK: The CIA, Vietnam, and the Plot to Assassinate John F. Kennedy =

Book by L. Fletcher Prouty

JFK: The CIA, Vietnam and the Plot to Assassinate John F. Kennedy (ISBN 978-0806517728) is a book by L. Fletcher Prouty who was a Washington insider for nearly 20 years. It was first published in 1992.

== Background ==
Prouty served as Chief of Special Operations for the Joint Chiefs of Staff under US President John F Kennedy in the last few years in his long career as a military intelligence agent. His book served as one of the sources for the Oliver Stone movie JFK, and it has an Introduction written by Stone himself.

Prouty was made famous for being the origin of the anonymous character "Mr. X", played by Donald Sutherland in the Stone movie. He is the character who asks Jim Garrison to ponder why Kennedy was killed. The president, he claims, had angered the military-industrial establishment with his procurement policies and his determination to withdraw from Vietnam, and had threatened to break the CIA into "a thousand pieces" after the Bay of Pigs Invasion fiasco. The book speculates that President Kennedy's death was, in effect, a coup d'état that placed in the White House a very different man with a very different approach. A man much more acceptable to what Prouty consistently calls "the power elite."

Stone opens his introduction to the book writing that "...Prouty is a man whose name will go down in history. Not as a respected Establishment figure, no. He will be erased from the present history books, his version of history suppressed, his credibility denied, his integrity scorned. Yet in time he will endure."

== Reception ==
The book was promoted by the Liberty Lobby in its Spotlight publication. As anti-fascist researcher Chip Berlet wrote,

Spotlight used the opportunity of the release of Oliver Stone's film JFK to promote Fletcher Prouty... Prouty and Lane went on book promotion tours in tandem with the film. Spotlight wove its coverage of the film "JFK" around its theories about Jewish "dual loyalist" control of the U.S. government and the claim that the Israeli intelligence agency, Mossad, controls CIA covert operations.

== See also ==
- The Secret Team
- The Power Elite
