= Zeskind =

Zeskind is a surname.

Those bearing it include:

- Leonard Zeskind (1949–2025), American human rights activist, journalist and author
- Philip Zeskind (fl. 1980s), American psychologist
- Rachel Zeskind (born late 20th century), American actor, writer, et al.
