= Freedom (magazine) =

Scientology-published magazine

- First issue: 1968; 58 years ago
- Based in: Hemet, California, United States
- Language: English
- Website: www.freedommag.org/index.html
- ISSN: 1090-4468
- OCLC: 11990538

Freedom is a magazine published by the Church of Scientology since 1968. The magazine describes its focus as "Investigative Reporting in the Public Interest." A frequent topic is psychiatry, which Scientology strongly opposes.

== Content ==
In the late 1980s, the magazine constantly published articles critical of the Internal Revenue Service and its decision not to give Scientology a tax exemption status.

A 19-part series in the magazine about the assassination of John F. Kennedy was made into the book JFK by L. Fletcher Prouty, which Oliver Stone used as a source for his film JFK.

In 1993, Scientologist John Carmichael was a contributing editor to Freedom.

In 1994, the magazine ran what it called an "expose" on what it described as a "history of prejudice" toward minority groups and women by the St. Petersburg Times, a newspaper which the Church of Scientology had some three months earlier accused of "inflammatory" coverage based on "lies and innuendo." It specifically mentioned the newspaper had a low percentage of African Americans in senior and management positions and quotes one former employee of the paper who claimed that it had a glass ceiling for women. Finally, it also accused the editor of the Times, Andy Barnes, of a "striking lack of sensitivity" for some of his comments regarding the newspaper's efforts to actively recruit minorities. The St. Petersburg Times cited this behavior by the organization as evidence that "[t]he Church of Scientology still uses harassment and intimidation to fight its critics."

Beth Akiyama, Scientology staffer and a member of the organization's Office of Special Affairs division, explained to the St. Petersburg Times the Church of Scientology's motivations for writing about the Times stating: "We use Freedom as our mouthpiece in this area because we don't think our good deeds have been covered enough." Akiyama said that residents of Pinellas County "only get one side of the story, basically. So we give them the other side of the story." The main writer of pieces critical of the St. Petersburg Times, Scientology spokesman Richard Haworth, was also a member of the organization's Office of Special Affairs division.

Since 2019, there have been no new issues of Freedom Magazine that have been published by the Church of Scientology.

== Criticism ==
The journalistic integrity of Freedom magazine has been criticized at various times for alleged bias against perceived enemies of Scientology. In one case, facts in the magazine's 1995 compilation The Rise of Hatred and Violence, which concerned the church's dispute with Germany, were claimed by Brigitte Schön in the Marburg Journal of Religion to be "grossly distorted." Stephen Kent in the Marburg Journal of Religion wrote that the magazine's comparison of the dispute with 1930s Nazism had "general parallels with tactics advocated in the brainwashing manual," Brain-Washing: A Synthesis of the Russian Textbooks on Psychopolitics, published in 1955 by the Church of Scientology.

During Scientology's dispute and litigation against the Cult Awareness Network (CAN), Freedom Magazine was noted for running a sensationalized story headlined "CAN: The serpent of hatred, intolerance, violence, and death." In their 2006 book Introduction to New and Alternative Religions in America, authors Eugene V. Gallagher and W. Michael Ashcraft cite Freedom Magazine articles about CAN as an example of "the invective emanating from Scientology".

In a 1997 case, while the Clearwater Police Department was investigating the suspicious death of Scientologist Lisa McPherson, the magazine sent reporters to research alleged racism in the police department. The department said that Freedom magazine reporter Tom Whittle's premise was "preposterous" and noted the magazine sought information about officers who investigated complaints about Scientologists.

== See also ==
- Bibliography of Scientology
- Scientology controversies
