= Political Research Associates =

American think tank

- Founded: 1981; 45 years ago
- Founder: Jean Hardisty
- Type: Tax exempt non-profit organization
- Location: Somerville, Massachusetts, United States
- Key people: Chip Berlet
- Main organ: The Public Eye
- Revenue: $700,000
- Website: www.politicalresearch.org

Political Research Associates (PRA), formerly Midwest Research, is a non-profit progressive political research group located in Somerville, Massachusetts. It was founded in Chicago in 1981 by Jean Hardisty, a political scientist. In 1987 the group's name was changed and it relocated to Massachusetts. It is focused on studying the political right-wing. PRA publishes a quarterly magazine, The Public Eye.

== History ==
Political Research Associates began as a small progressive Chicago think tank called Midwest Research. It was established in 1981 by Jean Hardisty, a political scientist who received her PhD in 1981. Hardisty had been hired by the American Civil Liberties Union of Illinois to conduct research on the rise of the anti-feminist and anti-abortion movements. She wrote her report for the ACLU, and then left academia to devote herself full time to defending democracy and human rights against organized attacks by right wing groups and movements. In 1987, Midwest Research was renamed Political Research Associates, and moved headquarters to Somerville, Massachusetts.

When Hardisty was diagnosed with Non-Hodgkin lymphoma, she was referred to a medical center in Boston. Shinner chose to stay in Chicago with her partner. However, Chip Berlet and his spouse moved to the Boston area. After a few examinations in Boston, Hardisty was told her best treatment would be received in Oklahoma. She left the organization she founded in the hands of her staff. She later returned to resume her leadership position.

The year 1994 saw a rising wave of violence against persons in (or even suspected of being supportive of) LGBTQ communities. Hardisty contacted nationally-known organizers and strategists Suzanne Pharr and Loretta Ross and raised funds for a national strategy meeting at the Blue Mountain Center in the Adirondacks. What emerged was "A Call to Defend Democracy and Pluralism", November 17, 1994.

Hardisty testified as an expert witness in the court fight over Colorado’s Amendment 2, described by human rights groups as "homophobic". She was accompanied by staff member Chip Berlet and numerous boxes of documents prepared for submission as evidence in the case. The case defending Amendment Two quickly collapsed.

== Mission and activities ==
PRA studies the U.S. political right wing, as well as white supremacists, and paramilitary organizations. It has a full-time staff of six. The Executive Director is Tarso Luis Ramos. Jean V. Hardisty was the founder and director from 1981 to 2004. Chip Berlet was the group's senior analyst from 1981–2011. Peggy Shinner (a poet) was the first archivist. They also keep a library of far-right literature. It primarily serves to put out research and information on far-right movements. The PRA operates from an avowedly progressive and left-leaning orientation. The PRA worked closely with the Center for Democratic Renewal (CDR), another progressive organization working on monitoring the far right.

PRA publishes a quarterly magazine, The Public Eye, which reports on specific and current movements or trends within the U.S. political right, and also produces special reports. The group provides public speakers, and has staff on hand to answer queries from journalists, researchers, and activists. Its annual funding of approximately $700,000 per year comes from foundation grants, individual contributions, and the sale of research materials. Expenditures are directed toward staffing, general & administrative expenses, programs and fundraising.

It was one of a set of NGOs dedicated to surveilling the far-right, including the Southern Poverty Law Center (SPLC), Anti-Defamation League (ADL), Simon Wiesenthal Center, American Jewish Committee (AJC), and the CDR. Unlike other far-right monitor organizations like the SPLC and ADL, the PRA did not, as of 2003, have a backdoor relationship with law enforcement, instead explicitly denouncing such a connection. The PRA and CDR were, unlike groups like the ADL and the AJC, focused on progressive issues more broadly. Berlet and the PRA conflicted with the ADL for monitoring the left-wing rather than only the right.

Scholar George Michael noted the PRA in 2003 as "first and foremost a research institution", unlike the other "watchdog organizations" that monitored the far-right; he wrote that Berlet in particular had "endeavored to establish academic standards for PRA's research". Writers Robert L. Hilliard and Michael C. Keith praised the PRA in 1999, saying they "have provided some of the most significant research on the right wing". Scholar Jeffrey Kaplan argued that the PRA, alongside the smaller political watchdog organizations, served to "support and magnify the work of the ADL".

== See also ==
- Media Matters, a progressive watchdog that criticizes and monitors news media (especially the right & far right).
