= Mark Lane (author) =

American lawyer, politician and author (1927–2016)

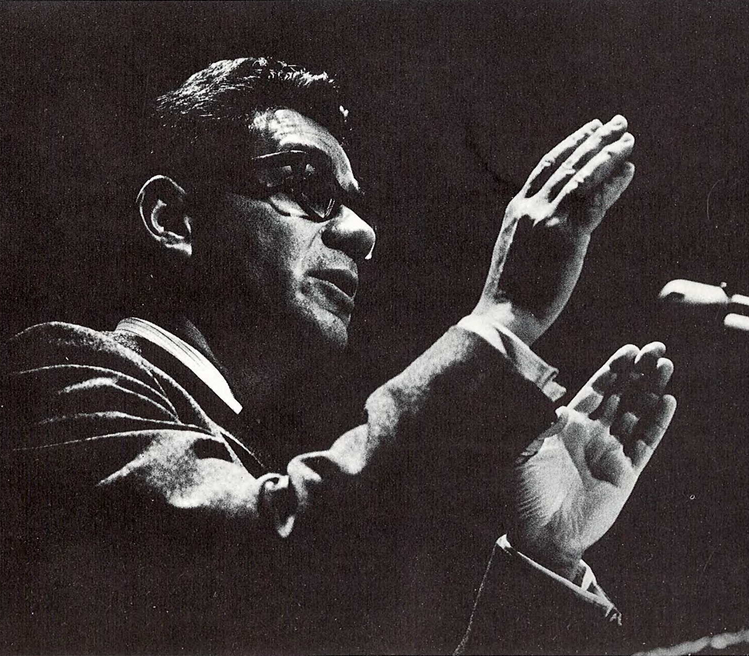
- Lane in Ann Arbor, 1967

Member of the New York State Assembly from New York County's 10th District
- In office 1 January 1961 – 31 December 1962
- Preceded by: Martin J. Kelly, Jr.
- Succeeded by: Carlos M. Rios

Personal details
- Born: February 24, 1927 The Bronx, New York, U.S.
- Died: May 10, 2016 (aged 89) Charlottesville, Virginia, U.S.
- Party: Democratic
- Other political affiliations: Freedom and Peace (1968)
- Spouse(s): Suzanne Wecht (m. 1950, annulled) Martha Schlamme (m. 1953, divorced) Anne-Lise Dabelsteen (m. 1964, divorced) Pat Erdner (m. 1986)
- Children: 3
- Known for: Conspiracy theorist on the assassination of John F. Kennedy
- Notable work: Rush to Judgment; Executive Action; Plausible Denial

Mark Lane (February 24, 1927 – May 10, 2016) was an American attorney, New York state legislator, civil rights activist, and Vietnam war-crimes investigator. Lane is best known as a leading researcher, author, and conspiracy theorist on the assassination of U.S. President John F. Kennedy.

Lane authored or co-authored a dozen books, including five on the JFK assassination, the most notable of which was Rush to Judgment (1966). It reached number one on The New York Times bestseller list. The book was written as a trial lawyer's adversarial argument against the methods and conclusions of the Warren Commission. Lane's lifelong involvement with the JFK assassination began shortly after the events in Dallas when he was retained by Marguerite Oswald, mother of accused assassin Lee Harvey Oswald, to represent her murdered son before the Warren Commission. Lane later defended other publicly scorned outcasts such as convicted assassin James Earl Ray, American Indian Movement activists Dennis Banks and Russell Means, and cult leader Jim Jones. One of Lane's most gratifying legal achievements came in 1989 when he obtained the release of James Richardson, an African-American man wrongfully convicted of murdering his own children.

== Early life and career ==
Mark Lane was born in the Bronx, a borough of New York City, on February 24, 1927. He was the son of Harry and Elizabeth Levin (Levin was changed to Lane in the 1920s), and was raised in the Flatbush neighborhood of Brooklyn. His sister was the historian Ann J. Lane. He served in the U.S. Army from 1945 to 1946. It was soon after the end of World War II, and he was stationed in Austria. He earned his undergraduate degree from Long Island University, and then received a Bachelor of Laws from Brooklyn Law School in 1951. As a law student, he was the administrative assistant to the National Lawyers Guild. He once organized a fund-raising event for the Guild at Town Hall in New York City; it featured blacklisted American folk singer Pete Seeger, blues artist Sonny Terry, and the Austrian-born singer Martha Schlamme whom Lane subsequently married.

Following his admission to the New York bar in 1951, Lane established a practice with Seymour Ostrow in East Harlem. Although Lane acquired a reputation as "a defender of the poor and oppressed", Ostrow later asserted that Lane was "motivated more by his ambition and quest for publicity than any dedication to a cause or concern for the interest of his clients." Their partnership dissolved in the late 1950s. In 1956 Lane began his political involvement as a key worker in the successful election campaign of Alfred E. Santangelo for Congress. Afterwards he was appointed as his executive assistant and ran his New York congressional office for three years.

In 1959, Lane was active in the New York Committee for Democratic Voters, also known as the Reform Democratic Movement. He co-founded it along with former first lady Eleanor Roosevelt and ex-New York Governor Herbert H. Lehman. The movement challenged the Tammany Hall machine that still wielded influence in the New York Democratic Party, both in New York City and statewide. That year he became campaign manager for John Harrington, who successfully contested in the Tenth Assembly District. Lane decided to become a candidate in the 1960 election, vying for a seat in the New York State Assembly. He was endorsed by Eleanor Roosevelt, who made campaign appearances with him.

In the run-up to the 1960 election, Lane was contacted by presidential candidate John F. Kennedy, who sought Lane's help "to coordinate the varying, indeed conflicting, elements of the Democratic party in New York". To that end, Lane managed the New York City area's campaign for Kennedy, and he also met with the candidate on three occasions, taking publicity photos together in one of them. Lane would later write that those photos and JFK's endorsement were "significant factors" in Lane's narrow victory in November.

As a member of the New York State Assembly in 1961 and 1962, Lane represented New York County's 10th District, encompassing East Harlem and Yorkville, where Lane resided. In the legislature, he spent considerable time working to abolish capital punishment. As he promised, he served only one term and then managed the campaign for his replacement.

In June 1961, during the civil rights movement, Lane was the only sitting legislator to be arrested for opposing segregation as a Freedom Rider. In 1962, he ran for Congress in the Democratic primary and lost. Afterwards he went on to serve as a lawyer for the Congress of Racial Equality (CORE). In the 1968 presidential election, Lane appeared on the ballot as a third party vice-presidential candidate, running on the Freedom and Peace Party ticket (an offshoot of the Peace and Freedom Party) with Dick Gregory.

== Assassination of John F. Kennedy ==
=== Warren Commission ===
After the assassination of President John F. Kennedy, Lane wrote a letter to Chief Justice Earl Warren on December 17, 1963, requesting that the Warren Commission give consideration to appointing defense counsel to advocate for Lee Harvey Oswald's rights, and enclosed a 10,000 word "brief" that he had submitted for publication. The only newspaper that would publish the brief was a small New York-based left-wing weekly, the National Guardian, where it appeared on December 19—just four weeks after the assassination—with the article title, "Oswald Innocent? A Lawyer's Brief". Lane organized the article as a set of arguments against fifteen assertions by Dallas County District Attorney Henry Wade regarding the JFK assassination and the murder of Dallas policeman J. D. Tippit, followed by a defense of Oswald who deserved, in Lane's estimation, "the presumption of innocence". Oswald's mother, Marguerite Oswald, reached out to Lane after reading the article.

In late December, Lane traveled to Dallas to question Oswald's family and, on January 2, suggested to Mrs. Oswald that she sue the city of Dallas for the death of her son. Lane said: "It would be an attempt to give Lee Oswald in death what he could not obtain in life—a fair trial." Mrs. Oswald announced on January 14 that she had hired Lane to represent her deceased son before the Warren Commission. After Lane notified the Commission that he had been retained by Marguerite Oswald, the Commission's general counsel J. Lee Rankin replied: "The Commission does not believe that it would be useful or desirable to permit an attorney representing Lee Harvey Oswald to have access to the investigative materials within the possession of the Commission or to participate in any hearings to be conducted by the Commission." Although the Commission would soon reverse its position in February when it appointed Walter E. Craig, president of the American Bar Association, to represent Oswald, Lane remarked that he still considered himself to be Oswald's counsel.

Lane testified before the Warren Commission on March 4, 1964 and again on July 2, 1964. In his March 4 testimony, he said he had conducted a phone interview five days earlier with Helen Markham (a witness to the Officer Tippit murder), and that she described Tippit's killer as "short, a little on the heavy side, and his hair was somewhat bushy". Lane added, "I think it is fair to state that an accurate description of Oswald would be average height, quite slender with thin and receding hair."

At the beginning of April, Mrs. Oswald asked Lane for a copy of his report, and requested that he halt any further "organized campaign" on behalf of her son through the Citizens' Committee of Inquiry (CCI), and she terminated his representation.

In his July 2 testimony, Lane's exchanges with Chief Justice Warren were often heated. After Lane reiterated his request to serve as Oswald's counsel, Warren reminded him that the Commission had previously denied his request to act as counsel, explaining that Marina Oswald was her late husband's legal representative and that she was already represented by counsel. In addressing the assertion that Markham's description of Tippit's killer did not resemble Oswald, the Commission's lawyers said they had reviewed the telephone transcript in which she was alleged to have made her comments to Lane. The Warren Report stated: "A review of the complete transcript has satisfied the Commission that Mrs. Markham strongly reaffirmed her positive identification of Oswald and denied having described the killer as short, stocky and having bushy hair." The discrepancy over this matter was a key rationale for Lane to reappear before the Commission in July. Chief Justice Warren told Lane that the Commission had "every reason to doubt the truthfulness" of some of his testimony due to his apparent misrepresentation of what Markham told him. It was observed that Warren displayed significant contempt for Lane. According to biographer Ed Cray, Warren deemed Lane "a publicity seeker who played fast and loose with the subject." Warren maintained that the Commission had investigated all leads and left no witness unheard.

Lane's work on the assassination prompted Bertrand Russell to rally support for the formation of a Who Killed Kennedy Committee in Britain.

In October 1964 Lane debated Jack Ruby's defense lawyer Melvin Belli at the Manhattan Center. In December 1966, Lane debated William F. Buckley Jr. on an episode of the latter's television program Firing Line, in which Buckley defended the Warren Report. In the latter half of the 1960s Lane would act as a consultant to the New Orleans District Attorney, Jim Garrison, during his investigation into the assassination. He was later interviewed for the 1992 documentary The JFK Assassination: The Jim Garrison Tapes.

In 1975, Lane restarted the Citizens' Committee of Inquiry with him as its director (it was now called the Citizens Commission of Inquiry). The CCI lobbied Congress to reopen the JFK murder probe. In September 1976, in legislation Lane helped draft, Congress voted to create a House Select Committee on Assassinations (HSCA). Also in 1976, Lane worked with director Lincoln Carle on a 48-minute documentary titled Two Men in Dallas. It mainly consists of an interview Lane conducted with Dallas Deputy Sheriff Roger D. Craig, who recalls what he witnessed on the day JFK was killed.

=== Rush to Judgment ===
Lane's critique of the Warren Commission, Rush to Judgment, was published in 1966. The book became a number one best seller and remained on The New York Times best-seller list for over 25 weeks. In 1967, it was adapted into a documentary film. This was the first film, documentary or otherwise, to criticize the Warren Commission.

In the manner of an adversarial trial lawyer, Lane wrote Rush to Judgment as a point-by-point rebuttal of the Warren Report. He questioned, among other things, the conclusion that the only shots fired were from the Texas School Book Depository. He quoted numerous witnesses who recounted seeing or hearing shots coming from the grassy knoll in Dealey Plaza. He stated that none of the Warren Commission firearm experts were able to duplicate Oswald's alleged shooting feat. As one writer put it, "The main argument of Rush to Judgment centered around the perceived improbability of Oswald acting alone." Lane also raised doubts—based on timeline, ballistics, and witness testimony—whether Oswald murdered Dallas police officer J.D. Tippit, as the Warren Commission asserted. Lane's book, along with Edward Jay Epstein's 1966 bestseller Inquest, undermined public confidence in the government's account of the JFK assassination.

At a news conference a few months after the release of Rush to Judgment, Texas Governor John Connally called Lane a "journalistic scavenger". Lane responded that Connally had shown "an abysmal ignorance to the implications of his own testimony" and was seeking to "bring back the days of McCarthyism.

According to former KGB officer Vasili Mitrokhin in his 1999 book The Sword and the Shield, the KGB helped finance Lane's research on Rush to Judgment without the author's knowledge. The KGB reputedly used journalist Genrikh Borovik as a contact and provided Lane with $2000 for research and travel in 1964. Lane labeled the allegation "an outright lie" and wrote, "Neither the KGB nor any person or organization associated with it ever made any contribution to my work."

In 2026, audio recordings from the Assassination Records Review Board showed that the FBI had a sexually compromising photo of Lane in their possession.

=== Other JFK assassination books ===
In 1968, Lane wrote A Citizen's Dissent, which contained his latest criticisms of the Warren Report, as well as his reply to the many attacks he received for Rush to Judgment.

In 1973, he and Donald Freed published the novel Executive Action, a fictionalized account of a conspiracy to assassinate President Kennedy. Concurrent with the novel's publication, a film project was initiated with Lane and Freed assigned to write the screenplay. After the film project stalled because of financing problems, it was picked up by producer Edward Lewis, director David Miller, and writer Dalton Trumbo. The original Lane-Freed screenplay strongly implicated the CIA in the assassination, but that hypothesis was muted in Trumbo's revised screenplay. Lane and Freed protested privately to the producer and publicly at press conferences that errors had been introduced into their work. However, Executive Action was released as is in November 1973. Lane and Freed had their names removed as co-writers of the screenplay. They only received credit for contributing the story. Lane's associate Steve Jaffe was supervising producer and credited with providing research material for the film.

In 1991, Lane told Patricia Holt of the San Francisco Chronicle that his new book Plausible Denial would be his "last word" on the subject: "I'll never write another sentence about the (JFK) assassination". But in November 2011, he published one final JFK assassination book titled Last Word: My Indictment of the CIA in the Murder of JFK, featuring an introduction by Robert K. Tanenbaum.

=== Liberty Lobby appeal trial ===
The political advocacy group Liberty Lobby published an article in The Spotlight newspaper in 1978 implicating E. Howard Hunt (a convicted Watergate burglar and former CIA agent) in the JFK assassination. Hunt sued Liberty Lobby for defamation and was awarded $650,000 in damages. Representing Liberty Lobby on appeal, Lane succeeded in having this judgment reversed, due to an error in the jury instructions. Lane then represented Liberty Lobby at a 1985 retrial of the case, winning a verdict rejecting Hunt's libel claim.

This case became the basis for Lane's Plausible Denial (1991). In the book, he says he convinced the jury of Hunt's involvement in the JFK assassination. Lane cites a transcript excerpt from his cross-examination of Hunt in which the latter was seemingly caught in a contradiction concerning his whereabouts on November 22, 1963. However, mainstream news accounts asserted that some jurors decided the case on the issue of whether The Spotlight had acted with "actual malice", as required by the Supreme Court's First Amendment precedents governing libel against public figures.

Lane also represented Willis Carto, a founder of Liberty Lobby, after Carto lost control of the Institute for Historical Review in 1993.

=== Random House suit ===
In 1995, Lane lost a defamation suit against book publisher Random House, which used the caption "Guilty of Misleading the American Public" under a photo of Lane in an advertisement for Gerald Posner's book Case Closed: Lee Harvey Oswald and the Assassination of JFK (1993). Lane sought $10 million in damages for disparagement of his integrity and the unauthorized use of his photograph. He was rebuked by Judge Royce C. Lamberth of the U.S. District Court for the District of Columbia, who said: "A conspiracy theory warrior outfitted with Lane's acerbic tongue and pen should not expect immunity from an occasional, constrained chastisement."

== Vietnam War crimes investigations ==
In 1970, Lane involved himself in several war crime inquiries being conducted primarily by antiwar organizations such as the National Committee for a Citizens Commission of Inquiry on U.S. War Crimes in Vietnam (abbreviated as Citizens Commission of Inquiry or CCI) and the Vietnam Veterans Against the War (VVAW). Lane used his contacts and raised funds to support these investigations, including what would become the CCI's National Veterans Inquiry and the VVAW's Winter Soldier Investigation. CCI and VVAW had originally combined their efforts toward the production of one large war crime investigation, and Lane was invited to join the organizing steering committee. He suggested the name "Winter Soldier", based on Thomas Paine's description in "Common Sense" of the "summer soldier and the sunshine patriot" at Valley Forge shrinking from service to their country in a time of crisis. Lane would often travel with fellow activist Jane Fonda to antiwar speaking engagements and fundraising rallies. They made an appearance together on The Dick Cavett Show in 1970. He wrote a book, Conversations with Americans, a collection of 32 tape-recorded interviews with U.S. servicemen about war crimes in the Vietnam War.

CCI staffers criticized Lane as being arrogant and sensationalistic, and said the book he was writing had "shoddy reporting in it". They refused to work with him further and gave the VVAW leadership a "Lane or us" ultimatum. VVAW did not wish to lose the monetary support of Lane and Fonda, and so the CCI split from the project. The following month, after the publication of caustic reviews of Conversations with Americans by journalists and a Vietnam expert, VVAW also distanced itself from Lane.

A review of Lane's book by Neil Sheehan in the New York Times Book Review claimed that four of the 32 servicemen interviewed by Lane had misrepresented their military service, according to the Defense Department, and that Lane apparently fabricated other interviews. Sheehan labeled Conversations "irresponsible", concluding: "Some of the horror tales in this book are undoubtedly true", and the "men who now run the military establishment cannot conduct a credible investigation.... But until the country does summon up the courage to convene a responsible inquiry, we probably deserve the Mark Lanes." Lane would later say that Sheehan "accepted the false statements provided to him by the Pentagon" and added that he "did not consult the former Department of Justice attorney referred to in the introduction who would have provided the real names for those who used pseudonyms". As a result of the firestorm stirred up by Sheehan, Simon & Schuster pulled Conversations from bookstores, and reneged on its contract with Lane by refusing to publish a paperback version, and by demanding he return his book advance. Lane relates in his autobiography how he then traveled around the country collecting statements from the military personnel who he was charged with fabricating. He and his agent met with Simon & Schuster to review the documents disproving Sheehan's allegations. The publisher apologized, withdrew its request for repayment of the advance, and paid a substantial sum to Lane for damages.

The negative reviews of Conversations with Americans caused concern in the VVAW leadership, as Andrew E. Hunt notes:

Sheehan's exposé had placed VVAW leaders in a difficult position. Lane's involvement with the planning of the Winter Soldier Investigation had been extensive. His legal and financial assistance had proven invaluable. Few VVAWers doubted his sincerity or devotion to the effort. Yet they feared associating with Lane could tarnish months of difficult work. "Then the question became, 'How do we protect our integrity?'" recalled Joe Urgo, "'How do we separate ourselves from this guy?'" Organizers hoped Lane would maintain a low profile. Their wishes were fulfilled.

VVAW veterans participating in the WSI event then realized they needed to take control. A new, all-veteran steering committee was formed without Lane. Ultimately, the WSI was an event produced by veterans only, without the need of civilians such as Lane and Fonda.

== Assassination of Martin Luther King Jr. ==
In 1977, Lane and Dick Gregory published Code Name "Zorro": The Murder of Martin Luther King, Jr. in which the two authors accused the FBI and Memphis Police Department of being principal conspirators in the April 1968 King assassination, with government complicity in the coverup. The "Zorro" in the title was a reference to a reported FBI moniker for King. When the book was reissued in a revised version in 1993, the title was changed to Murder in Memphis.

In the book, Lane recounts his successful attempt to track down an important assassination witness, Grace Stephens. She had been staying in the Memphis boarding house from where James Earl Ray (King's convicted assassin) was said to have fired the fatal shot from the window of a shared bathroom on her floor. The door to her room was open. After hearing a rifle shot, she saw a man leave the bathroom carrying something long in his right hand. Her description of the man did not match Ray. In July 1968, she was confined to Western State Psychiatric Hospital in Bolivar, Tennessee, which is where Lane located her in November 1977 and conducted an interview. In his memoir, he chronicles how he smuggled out his tape recording of the Stephens interview despite the efforts of hospital employees and Memphis police officers to confiscate it.

In 1978, Lane represented James Earl Ray before the House Select Committee on Assassinations (HSCA) inquiry. The HSCA said of Lane in its report: "Many of the allegations of conspiracy that the committee investigated were first raised by Mark Lane". He wrote an audio docudrama, Trial of James Earl Ray, that was broadcast on KPFK on April 3, 1978, casting doubt on Ray's guilt. Lane's thesis was that Ray had been an innocent pawn in a government plot.

== Peoples Temple ==
=== Engagement and work for the Peoples Temple ===
In 1978, Lane began to represent the Peoples Temple. Temple leader Jim Jones hired Lane and Donald Freed to help make the case for what was purported to be a "grand conspiracy" by intelligence agencies against the Peoples Temple. Jones told Lane he wanted to "pull an Eldridge Cleaver", referring to the fugitive Black Panther who was able to return to the United States after repairing his reputation.

In September 1978, Lane visited Jonestown, spoke to Jonestown residents, provided support for the theory that intelligence agencies conspired against Jonestown and drew parallels between Martin Luther King Jr. and Jim Jones. Lane then held press conferences stating that "none of the charges" against the Temple "are accurate or true" and that there was a "massive conspiracy" against the Temple by "intelligence organizations", naming the CIA, FBI, FCC and the U.S. Post Office. Though Lane represented himself as disinterested, the Temple paid Lane $6,000 per month to help generate such theories. Regarding the effect of the work of Lane and Freed upon Temple members, Temple member Annie Moore wrote that "Mom and Dad have probably shown you the latest about the conspiracy information that Mark Lane, the famous attorney in the M.L. King case and Don Freed the other famous author in the Kennedy case have come up with regarding activities planned against us—Peoples Temple." Another Temple member, Carolyn Layton, wrote that Don Freed told them, "anything that is this drug-out could be nothing less than conspiracy".

=== Jonestown deaths ===
Lane was present in Jonestown, Guyana (northern Sth. America) during the evening of November 18, 1978, and witnessed or heard part of the events claiming at least 408 lives (out of a total recount of 915 carried out five days later); these events entailed a collective suicide and murder by cyanide poisoning, and were compounded by the murder of Congressman Leo Ryan and four others at a nearby airstrip. For months before the incident, Temple cult-leader James Jones frequently created fear among members by stating that the CIA and other intelligence agencies were conspiring with "capitalist pigs" to destroy Jonestown and harm its members. This included mentions of CIA involvement in the address Jones gave the day before the arrival of Congressman Ryan.

During the visit of Congressman Ryan, Lane helped represent the Temple along with its other attorney, Charles R. Garry, who was furious with Lane for holding numerous press conferences and alleging the existence of conspiracies against the Peoples Temple. Garry was also displeased with Lane for making a veiled threat that the Temple might move to the Soviet Union in a letter to Congressman Ryan.

Late in the afternoon of November 18, two men wielding rifles approached Lane and Garry, who had earlier been sent to a small wooden house by Jones. It is not clear whether the gunmen were sent to kill Lane and Garry, but one of the gunmen recognized Garry as an attorney in a trial that the gunman had attended. After a relatively friendly exchange, the men informed Garry and Lane that they were going to "commit revolutionary suicide" to "expose this racist and fascist society". The gunmen then gave Garry and Lane directions to exit Jonestown. Garry and Lane then sneaked into the jungle, where they hid and called a temporary truce while the deaths unfolded.

On a tape made while members committed suicide by ingesting cyanide-poisoned punch, the reason given by Jones to commit suicide was consistent with Jones's previously stated conspiracy theories of intelligence organizations allegedly conspiring against the Temple, that men would "parachute in here on us", "shoot some of our innocent babies" and "they'll torture our children, they'll torture some of our people here, they'll torture our seniors". Parroting Jones's prior statements that hostile forces would convert captured children to fascism, one temple member states, "[T]he ones that they take captured, they're gonna just let them grow up and be dummies".

=== After the massacre ===
Lane wrote a book about the incident, The Strongest Poison. He reported hearing automatic weapon fire and presumes that U.S. forces killed Jonestown survivors. While Lane blames Jones and Peoples Temple leadership for the deaths at Jonestown, he also claims that U.S. officials exacerbated the possibility of violence by employing agents provocateurs. For example, Lane claimed that Temple attorney (and later defector) Timothy Stoen had repeatedly prompted the Temple to take radical action before defecting, "had evidently led three lives", one of those being a government informant or agent.

== Later career and death ==
In 1968 he published the book Chicago Eyewitness about the Democratic National Convention protests that year.

In Lane's 1970 book Arcadia, he sought to prove that James Joseph Richardson, a black migrant worker in Florida, had been falsely accused of killing his seven children. The book alleged that Richardson was convicted of the murders through corrupt means used by the authorities involved. He languished on death row for almost five years, escaping execution only by virtue of the Furman v. Georgia Supreme Court decision.

Lane defended some of those who were arrested during the course of the Wounded Knee Occupation in 1973. He served as a spokesman for the Wounded Knee Legal Offense‐Defense Committee. Alongside William Kunstler, he successfully defended Russell Means and Dennis Banks, who were eventually acquitted.

Nineteen years after Arcadia was published, Richardson received a hearing in which the charges were dropped thanks to the interventions of Lane and Miami's then-prosecutor Janet Reno. Richardson's babysitter, Betsy Reese, though suffering from dementia, later confessed to the crimes. Richardson was released from prison after 21 years. Lane's wife Pat said in an interview that when her husband was finally able to shout "You're free, James!" to a disbelieving Richardson, it was the happiest moment of her husband's career.

Lane spent his last years residing in Charlottesville, Virginia. He continued to practice law and lectured on many subjects, especially the importance of the United States Constitution (mainly the Bill Of Rights and the First Amendment) and civil rights.

Lane was one of twelve legal experts featured by panel moderator Bernard Hibbitts (University of Pittsburgh Law School professor) at the annual Law Library of Congress and American Bar Association Law Day symposium in 2001. The panel considered the question, "Who are the paradigms for the lawyer as reformer in American culture?" In 2012 he published his autobiography, Citizen Lane, which included a foreword by the actor Martin Sheen.

On May 10, 2016, Mark Lane died of a heart attack at his home in Charlottesville. He was 89.

== Works ==
=== Books ===
- Rush to Judgment: A Critique of the Warren Commission's Inquiry into the Murders of President John F. Kennedy, Officer J.D. Tippit and Lee Harvey Oswald. Holt, Rinehart and Winston, 1966, LCCN 66-23886.
- The Silent Slaughter: The Role of the United States in the Indonesian massacre. Marzani & Munsell for Youth Against War and Fascism, 1966, OCLC 1075621167, co-authored with Eric Norden, William Worthy, and Andrew March.
- A Citizen's Dissent: Mark Lane Replies to the Defenders of the Warren Report. Holt, Rinehart and Winston, 1968, OCLC 385224
- Chicago Eyewitness. Astor-Honor, 1968, ISBN 978-0839250135.
- Arcadia. Holt, Rinehart and Winston, 1970, ISBN 978-0030818547.
- Conversations with Americans: Testimony from 32 Vietnam Veterans. Simon & Schuster, 1970, ISBN 978-0671207687.
- Executive Action: Assassination of a Head of State. Dell Publishing Co., 1973, OCLC 652746, co-authored with Donald Freed. Introduction by Richard H. Popkin
- Code Name "Zorro": The Murder of Martin Luther King, Jr. Prentice-Hall, 1977, ISBN 978-0131396005, co-authored with Dick Gregory. Reissued as Murder in Memphis: The FBI and the Assassination of Martin Luther King. Thunder's Mouth Press, 1993, ISBN 978-1560250562.
- The Strongest Poison. Hawthorne Books, 1980, ISBN 080153206X.
- Plausible Denial: Was the CIA Involved in the Assassination of JFK? Thunder's Mouth Press, 1991, ISBN 978-1560250005. Introduction by L. Fletcher Prouty.
- Rush to Judgment. 2nd edition issued by Thunder's Mouth Press, 1992, ISBN 978-1560250432.
- Last Word: My Indictment of the CIA in the Murder of JFK. Skyhorse Publishing, 2011, ISBN 978-1616084288. Introduction by Robert K. Tanenbaum.
- Citizen Lane: Defending our Rights in the Courts, the Capitol, and the Streets. Lawrence Hill Books, 2012, ISBN 978-1613740019. Foreword by Martin Sheen.

=== Other ===
- Foreword to O'Toole, G. J. A. (1977). The Assassination Tapes (revised ed.). Zebra Books.

== Documentary ==
- Citizen Lane. US, 2013 (102 min) – directed by Pauley Perrette

New York State Assembly
Preceded by Martin J. Kelly, Jr.	New York State Assembly; New York County, 10th District; 1961–1962	Succeeded by Carlos M. Rios
