= Volunteer Ministers =

Scientology outreach group

Scientology Volunteer Ministers
- Abbreviation: VM
- Services: Pass out Church of Scientology publications; Scientology Assists
- Parent organization: Church of Scientology International
- Website: volunteerministers.org

A Volunteer Minister (VM) is a member of the Church of Scientology sent to a disaster area to spread the doctrine of Scientology during disaster relief efforts. The program was created in the 1970s by Scientology founder L. Ron Hubbard.

The Church of Scientology says that the program constitutes "the only effective steps to arrest and reverse the deterioration of [the] world", but critics argue that Scientology uses the program to gain positive media attention and recruit new members (known within Scientology as "raw meat").

There has been controversy over the group's goals and activities.

== Objectives ==
According to Hubbard, the objective of the program is to "put basic Dianetics and Scientology technology into view and into use at the raw public level." In Hubbard's words, The Volunteer Minister's Handbook "will be broadly distributed on [Scientology] and non-Scientology lines, bought by the man on the street. He'll use some of the data, produce some miracles, save a marriage or two, rescue some kid from drugs, help his next door neighbor who's upset because her child's failing in school and couldn't care less, plus brighten up her yawning of Spring and teach him to study, and handle Aunt Martha's dizziness with assists."

Each Volunteer Minister pays to attend a two-week course and purchase Scientology materials; in 1994, these materials cost $435. The book is called The Scientology Handbook and is 968 pages long.

== Origins ==
He should represent himself to the person or the person's family as a minister whose compassion was compelled by the newspaper story concerning the person

— L. Ron Hubbard, "Three methods of dissemination"

The program is the successor to earlier Scientology outreach efforts, notably the "Casualty Contact" program for recruiting new Scientologists (called "preclears") from hospitals, the scenes of accidents and other places where people might have experienced trauma. As Hubbard put it, "One takes every daily paper he can get his hands on and cuts from it every story whereby he might have a preclear. [...] He should represent himself to the person or the person's family as a minister whose compassion was compelled by the newspaper story concerning the person. [...]."

Hubbard advised that "using his minister's card, an auditor need only barge into any non-sectarian hospital, get permission to visit the wards from the superintendent, mentioning nothing about processing but only about taking care of people's souls." The primary objective was simply to recruit more members for Scientology: "Some small percentage of the persons visited or their families will turn up in his group. Thus he will build a group and naturally from that group he will get a great many individual preclears." This was, however, not how the program was to be presented to the general public: "A great many miracles will follow in his wake and he is later to become a subject of the press himself. However, in handling the press we should simply say that it is a mission of the Church to assist those who are in need of assistance."

The Volunteer Ministers program is also intended to operate as a recruitment activity. As Hubbard puts it,

As the benefits of the Volunteer Minister program begin to spread throughout the society, a rank and file of people that have been helped will begin to accumulate. These people will begin to feed into missions and Churches of Scientology from wherever the Volunteer Minister has been at work.

== Activities ==
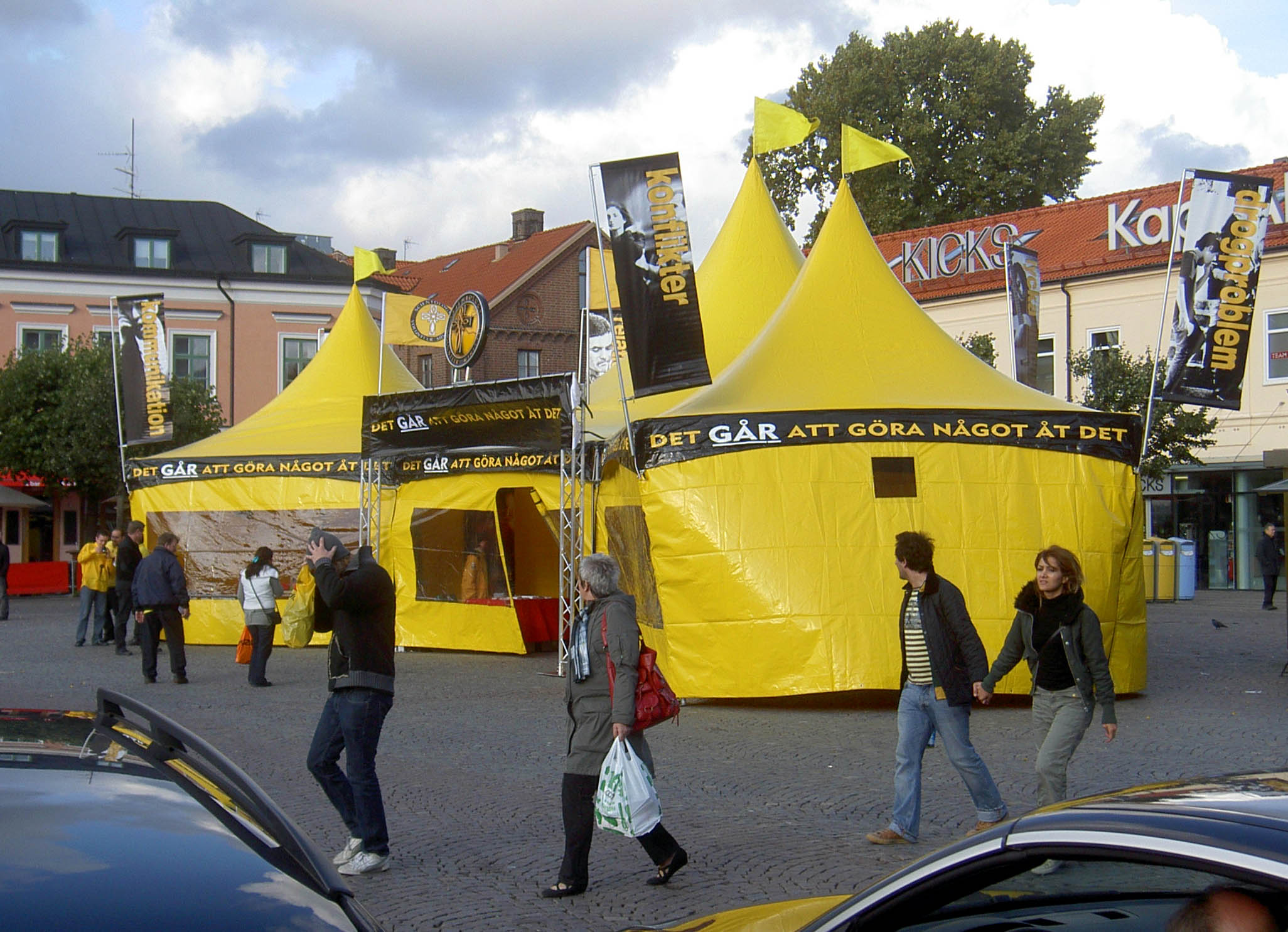
Scientology volunteer minister tent in Sweden, October 2008

Volunteer Ministers have been sent to the scenes of major disasters, where they have distributed Scientology pamphlets and purport to heal or relieve pain using Scientology techniques such as "Locationals," "Nerve assists" and "Touch assists."

VMs were sent to Southeast Asia after the 2004 Indian Ocean earthquake and tsunami. Eight hundred were sent following Hurricane Katrina in 2005.

In 2012, news broke that Volunteer Ministers were providing purification rundowns in Vietnam to people who had been exposed to Agent Orange. Doctors and researchers criticized the treatments as unscientific and unproven, and warned that the high doses of niacin administered could be harmful. Marcella L. Warner, who studies the long-term health effects of dioxin exposure, said that "a treatment focused on exercise and sweating would not be an effective way to rid the body of the toxin".

== Controversy ==
As with many of the Church of Scientology's programs, the Volunteer Ministers have generated controversy and criticism. They have been accused of attempting to take advantage of disasters in order to promote Scientology to a grief-stricken populace.

The Volunteer Minister program most heavily promoted by Scientology took place in the immediate aftermath of the 9/11 attacks. Critics of Scientology accused the organization of attempting to take advantage of the disaster in order to promote Scientology to the grief-stricken populace in the area. The National Mental Health Association issued a public warning in response to the conduct of Scientologists in the immediate aftermath of September 11, claiming that Scientologists were "Intentionally confusing [the] public" by presenting themselves as mental health service providers. According to NMHA President Michael M. Faenza, "The public needs to understand that the Scientologists are using this tragedy to recruit new members. They are not providing mental health assistance."

In Russia, after the Beslan school hostage crisis tragedy in 2004, the Health Ministry ordered Scientologists out of the area, saying "that various psychological tactics the groups use, including what it called hypnosis, may be harmful not only for adults, but for children that have already suffered severe mental shock."

In the United Kingdom, Volunteer Ministers played a similar role in the aftermath of the 7 July 2005 London bombings, targeting the families of victims and emergency workers. As in the United States in 2001, this resulted in controversy, and it was reported that Volunteer Ministers had been removed from the vicinity of survivors of the bus bombing in Tavistock Square. It later emerged that the Metropolitan Police had agreed to give the Church of Scientology privileged access to the Police Message Broadcasting System, enabling the Church to dispatch Volunteer Minister rapid-response teams in the event of future emergencies in the capital.

Paul Fletcher, director of the London branch of CCHR and Stefania Cisco, a Director of Special Affairs for Scientology, in 2006 admitted to an undercover BBC reporter that the purpose of the volunteer ministers was to keep the psychiatrists away, and called this "spiritual security".

In the US, after the Virginia Tech massacre, April 16, 2007, 20 Volunteer Ministers were on the campus. Bulletins to Scientology members said that help had been requested by the university provost, the Salvation Army and the Red Cross, but these organizations denied that any requests had been made. The activities of the Volunteer Ministers at Virginia Tech was reported to have received strong criticism from local pastors.

In 2020, during the COVID-19 pandemic, Scientology produced and printed booklets titled How to Keep Yourself and Others Well for a campaign to contact businesses and government offices in many countries. Distributed in person by Scientologists dressed as Volunteer Ministers, local business owners in Switzerland sought information from a local activism group, Freie Anti-Scientology Aktivisten [Free Anti-Scientology Activists] (FASA), because they had been told the booklet was produced in cooperation with the Swiss Federal Office of Public Health (BAG). FASA contacted BAG, received a response, and posted online that BAG reported no such cooperation with Scientology. The Church of Scientology Basel sued FASA for slander; the case was dismissed after an evidentiary hearing in September 2023.
