= Plausible Denial =

1991 book by American attorney Mark Lane

Plausible Denial: Was the CIA Involved in the Assassination of JFK?
- Author: Mark Lane
- Language: English
- Genre: Non-fiction
- Publisher: Thunder's Mouth Press
- Publication date: 1991

Plausible Denial: Was the CIA Involved in the Assassination of JFK? is a 1991 book by American attorney Mark Lane that outlines his theory that former Watergate figure E. Howard Hunt was involved with the Central Intelligence Agency in the assassination of United States President John F. Kennedy. Published by Thunder's Mouth Press, the book chronicles Lane's legal defense of Liberty Lobby, a right-wing political group that was sued for libel by Hunt after it published an article in its weekly paper, The Spotlight, linking Hunt — a former CIA operative — to the assassination. According to Lane, Thunder's Mouth Press agreed to publish it "after every other publisher in the United States had refused to do so".

The book features an introduction by L. Fletcher Prouty. Lane's chief source for Plausible Denial was Marita Lorenz, a woman contacted by Lane during the suit who provided a deposition stating that on the day prior to the assassination she transported guns from Miami to Dallas where she met Hunt, Frank Sturgis, and Jack Ruby. In the book, Lane states that the CIA arranged the assassination of Kennedy because Kennedy had planned to destroy the Agency. Others put forth by Lane to be involved in a conspiracy include George H. W. Bush and George de Mohrenschildt, whom he implicates as CIA agents.

In the book, Lane harshly criticizes the media for its failure to cover the trial and its unwillingness to even consider Kennedy assassination theories as having credibility.

== Reviews ==
Kirkus Reviews said Plausible Denial was a "convincing report" that was "[w]ell-reasoned at every point" and Publishers Weekly called it "[a] highly stimulating, disturbing book, marred only by repetitiousness and excessive self-justification." Writing for the Los Angeles Times, Alex Raskin wrote: "While Lane's evidence for Hunt's complicity is quite persuasive, his theorizing becomes more suspect when he moves beyond that trial in an attempt to implicate other U.S. government officials in the crime." Raskin added: "Ultimately, many of Lane's theories...are motivated less by actual evidence than by a predisposition to believe in a nefarious Establishment."

In a review for the Pittsburgh Post-Gazette, Bob Hoover wrote that Plausible Denial "will give little grist for conspiracy buffs to chew on." Hoover added: "Hunt's link to the [assassination of Kennedy] is not confirmed by Lane's poorly written and sanctimonious book." Patricia Holt of the San Francisco Chronicle interviewed Lane and called it "a fascinating and convincing — though uneven and often self-serving — indictment" of the CIA. Lane described Plausible Denial as his "last word" on the subject and told Holt: "I'll never write another sentence about the (JFK) assassination".

== See also ==
- Rush to Judgment, a 1966 book on the JFK assassination by the same author
