= Blood and Politics =

2009 book by Leonard Zeskind

Blood and Politics: The History of the White Nationalist Movement from the Margins to the Mainstream
- Author: Leonard Zeskind
- Language: English
- Subject: White nationalism
- Publisher: Farrar, Straus and Giroux
- Publication date: 2009
- Publication place: United States of America
- Pages: 645
- ISBN: 978-0-374-10903-5
- OCLC: 243544894
- Dewey Decimal: 305.800973
- LC Class: E184.A1 Z47 2009

Blood and Politics: The History of the White Nationalist Movement from the Margins to the Mainstream is a book by Leonard Zeskind. It was first published in 2009 by Farrar, Straus and Giroux.

== Background and publication history ==
Blood and Politics was published in 2009 by Farrar, Straus and Giroux.

== Contents ==
The book traces the evolution of white supremacist groups from the mid-1970s onward, highlighting their internal divisions and lack of cohesion. Zeskind focuses on the ongoing rift between “mainstreamers,” who moderate their rhetoric to gain broader acceptance, and hardline “vanguardists,” who maintain a separatist, militant stance.

The book discusses figures such as David Duke, Bo Gritz, Pat Robertson, and Willis Carto as well as various movements such as the Christian Identity Movement and the white power skinheads, specifically focuses on Willis Carto, William Luther Pierce, and David Duke.

== Reception ==
Reviewers considered the book to be one of the most comprehensive and well-researched histories of American white nationalism. For instance, Publishers Weekly called the book a "rigorously researched and eloquent book" that has the "breadth of an encyclopedia." However, the scope of the book was so wide and the contents so exhaustive that critics believed the book was repetitive and unfocused.

Art Winslow wrote in the Los Angeles Times that Zeskind's detailed, chronological narrative revealed not only the violence linked to white supremacist groups but also the troubling endurance of their ideologies. Despite legal, social, and political opposition, "vanguardists" have preserved and propagated the core beliefs of national socialism, offering a persistent foundation for future extremist activity. Dave Gilson criticized the book for not making a greater distinction between white Republicans and politically fringe figures and Chris Barsanti said that Zeskind's "style can be tendentious" but that "the weight of his scholarship ... is undeniably impressive." Another reviewer questioned whether the subjects discussed in the book were "steering the U.S. toward extended racial strife."
