= The Secret Team =

1973 book by L. Fletcher Prouty

The Secret Team: The CIA and Its Allies in Control of the United States and the World
- Cover of the 1973 Prentice-Hall first edition.
- Author: L. Fletcher Prouty
- Language: English
- Genre: History
- Publisher: Prentice-Hall
- Publication date: 1973
- Publication place: United States
- Media type: book
- Pages: 496
- ISBN: 978-0137981731
- OCLC: 869053900
- Text: The Secret Team: The CIA and Its Allies in Control of the United States and the World at Internet Archive

The Secret Team: The CIA and Its Allies in Control of the United States and the World is a book by L. Fletcher Prouty, a former colonel in the US Air Force, first published by Prentice-Hall in 1973.

== Publication history ==
After initial publication in 1973, Prentice-Hall republished The Secret Team in 1992 and 1997. The book was published again in 2008 and 2011 by Skyhorse Publishing, the latter edition including an introduction by Jesse Ventura.

The book was offered for sale by the Church of Scientology through their Freedom magazine, during the time when Prouty was a senior editor of the magazine.

== Reception ==
In Studies in Intelligence, an official journal and flagship publication of the Central Intelligence Agency, Walter Pforzheimer described reading the book as "like trying to push a penny with one's nose through molten fudge". Despite what he grants as Prouty's "considerable background and knowledge", he says the book is punctuated by "faulty recollections" and "unwarranted conclusions". In a later issue, a staff writer provides a retrospective of books reviewed in Studies in Intelligence and wonders aloud "whether word ever got back to [Prouty]".

Washington Monthly magazine noted that "marvelous anecdotes about the CIA's dirty-trick department are accompanied by a troubling overstatement best suggested by the subtitle, 'The CIA and Its Allies in Control of the United States and the World'".

Assassination researcher and former Office of Strategic Services officer Harold Weisberg was less than enthusiastic about Prouty's book. He was particularly turned off by the claim that Daniel Ellsberg was a CIA agent: "He hemmed and hawed a bit on this when confronted with an unequivocal denial made by E. to Fred Graham and to Prouty by phone. Thus he loses the legitimate point."

== See also ==
- Brought to Light
- Business Plot
- Conspiracy theory
- Military-industrial complex
- The Power Elite
