= Leonard Zeskind =

American journalist (1949–2025)

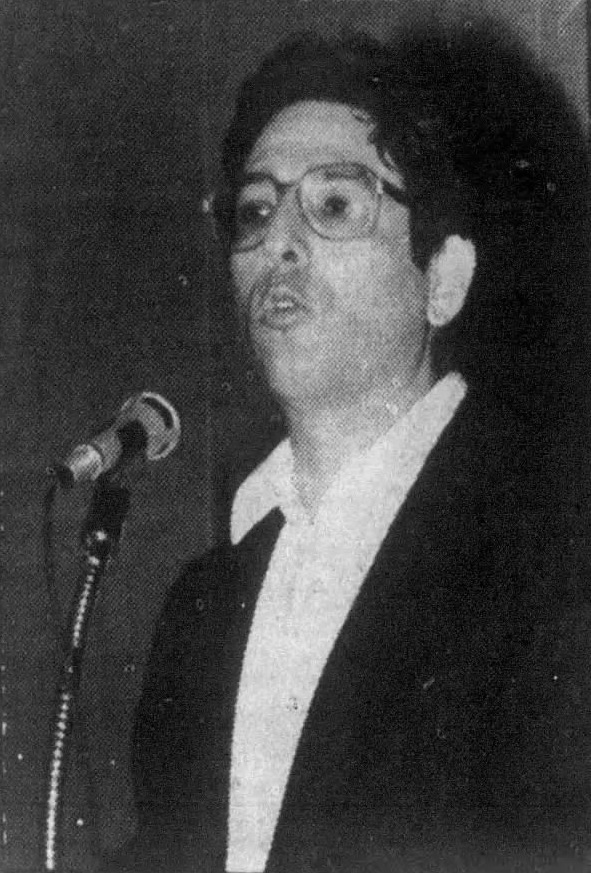
- Zeskind in 1987
- Born: November 14, 1949; Baltimore, Maryland, U.S.
- Died: April 15, 2025 (aged 75); Kansas City, Missouri, U.S.
- Occupations: Journalist; Human rights activist
- Notable work: Blood and Politics
- Spouses: Elaine Henrichs (m. 1971, divorced); Carol Smith (m. 1986)

Leonard Harold Zeskind (November 14, 1949 – April 15, 2025) was an American journalist and human rights activist. He led the Center for Democratic Renewal from 1985 to 1994 and was president of the Institute for Research and Education of Human Rights (IREHR), a social justice and public affairs watchdog organization. Zeskind wrote the 2009 book Blood and Politics, about the history of white nationalism in American politics.

== Early life and education ==
Leonard Harold Zeskind was born in Baltimore, Maryland on November 14, 1949, and grew up mostly in Miami, Florida. The son of Stanley and Shirley Zeskind (née Berman), he had two brothers. According to Zeskind, he grew up in a predominantly Jewish area; when his family later moved to an area that was not majority Jewish, he was confronted with antisemitism for the first time.

Growing up, Zeskind wished to be a scientist. He attended Miami Senior High School. He enrolled at the University of Miami and the University of Kansas, but did not receive a degree. He majored in philosophy and studied literature in his spare time. In college, he joined the student activist group Students for a Democratic Society. He was expelled from the University of Kansas for participating in protests against the Reserve Officers' Training Corps during the Vietnam War.

For thirteen years prior to his concentration on human rights, he worked in industry, including stints on an automobile assembly line, installing refrigerator motors in vending machines, and as a welder and first-class fitter in steel fabrication plants. He was a committee member of the Industrial Workers Union in Kansas City.

== Political activism ==
In the 1970s to the early 1980s, Zeskind was a member of the communist group the Sojourner Truth Organization (STO), along with his wife Elaine. Zeskind and Elaine brought the STO to Kansas City circa 1973. He was a prominent figure in the group's antifascist activities in their Kansas City branch. He was on the editorial board and wrote for their periodical, Urgent Tasks: Journal of the Revolutionary Left.

After the Greensboro massacre, the STO had an internal debate on how the STO was to handle Klan activity, which escalated into a debate on fascism more broadly and the ultimate publication of their "Theses on Fascism" in 1981. Zeskind took issue with the beliefs of Noel Ignatiev (also an STO member) that antisemitism would become less important in fascism going forward. Zeskind disagreed with this, considering antisemitism would remain a central element of fascism; a debate between Zeskind and Ignatiev on this issue was published in Urgent Tasks. This conflict escalated in light of the ongoing war in Lebanon and the Israel/Palestine conflict and disagreement on whether the STO should support the two state or one state solution. As a result, in 1982, the STO's Kansas City branch (which had for years experienced issues with the broader STO leadership), including Zeskind, left the STO to found their own antifascist collective. This group was short-lived.

Zeskind was known for his research into extreme right, racist, and antisemitic organizations in the United States. He was frequently quoted in the media as an expert on the subject. Zeskind later said that he "scared [himself]" into making an active effort to fight antisemitism from his research on the subject. After leaving the STO, he founded the Institute for Research and Education on Human Rights, Inc., an anti-racism public affairs watchdog organization, of which he was president. It published a periodical called The Hammer, which ran from 1982 to 1985. In 2021, the Institute for Research and Education of Human Rights served as a resource about such groups and their members when information about them rose dramatically following the January 6 United States Capitol attack.

In 1983, he became interested in combating antisemitism related to the ongoing farm protest movement, and said he learned tactics to combat antisemitism from the Kansas City Jewish Community Relations Bureau. Zeskind joined the National Anti-Klan Network, an anti-racism watchdog organization, a group heavily influenced by the STO. In 1985 it was renamed the Center for Democratic Renewal (CDR). It was based in Atlanta, and published several reports on the far-right movement. He served as a researcher for the CDR, and led the CDR from 1985 to 1994, one of the group's cofounders. Zeskind frequently traveled to monitor hate groups. He was secretive about his background, kept a low profile, and refused most photographs, fearing he would be targeted by racist groups. Zeskind also edited the progressive Jewish journal Schmate. As of 1986, he was a member of the American Jewish Committee's taskforce on extremism, a member of the local Jewish community relations group, and the chair of the Individual Liberties and Jewish Security Committee.

He also wrote for the British watchdog magazine Searchlight, which is devoted to tracking the activities of the far right; he was its American correspondant. On April 23, 1989, he spoke at a rally in Leeds, England, alongside Martin Becher of Anti-Fascist Action Group; Becher and Zeskind were touring England on behalf of Searchlight. In 1998, he was an honoree of the MacArthur Fellows Program, receiving a $295,000 grant to study right-wing extremism. He was one of 29 to receive a fellowship from the organization that year.

== Works ==
Zeskind wrote the 2009 book Blood and Politics, about the history of xenophobia and white nationalism in American politics. The New York Times noted his thesis that such views were only growing more mainstream was met with some skepticism at the time, but the book was viewed as increasingly prescient in the years to follow, particularly after the 2017 Unite the Right rally and similar events. In 2025, the book was among those removed from the library of the United States Naval Academy as part of the U.S. Department of Defense censorship of DEI-connected material.

== Personal life and death ==
Zeskind married Elaine Henrichs in 1971. The marriage ended in divorce. In 1986, Zeskind married Carol Smith, who he met in 1979.

He died from pancreatic cancer at his home in Kansas City, Missouri, on April 15, 2025, at the age of 75.

== Awards ==
- 1992 Petra Foundation Fellowship
- 1998 MacArthur Fellows Program

== Publications ==
- ——; Lawrence, Ken (1984). It's Not Populism: America's New Populist Party: A Fraud by Racists and Anti-Semites (Report). Atlanta: National Anti-Klan Network. OCLC 19336497.
- —— (1985). Background Report on Racist and Anti-Semitic Organizational Intervention in the Farm Protest Movement (Report). Atlanta: Center for Democratic Renewal. OCLC 19467180.
- —— (1986). Update on Anti-Semitic and Racist Intervention in the Farm Protest Movement (Report). Atlanta: Center for Democratic Renewal. OCLC 34172675.
- —— (1986). The "Christian Identity" Movement: A Theological Justification for Racist and Anti-Semitic Violence (Report). Division of Church and Society, National Council of the Churches of Christ in the U.S.A. OCLC 19380906.
  - —— (1987). The "Christian Identity" Movement: Analyzing Its Theological Rationalization for Racist and Anti-Semitic Violence (Report). Division of Church and Society of the National Council of the Churches of Christ in the U.S.A. OCLC 615014212.
- Lutz, Chris; —— (1987). They Don't All Wear Sheets: A Chronology of Racist and Far Right Violence, 1980-1986 (Report). Atlanta: Division of Church and Society of the National Council of the Churches of Christ in the U.S.A. OCLC 17745780.
- —— (1987). Peddling Racist Violence for a New Generation: A Profile of Tom Metzger and the White Aryan Resistance (Report). Atlanta: Center for Democratic Renewal. OCLC 22608736.
  - —— (1992). Tom Metzger and the White Aryan Resistance: Racist Violence in the Electronic Age (Report) (2nd ed.). Atlanta: Center for Democratic Renewal. OCLC 34172662.
- Segrest, Mab; —— (1989). Quarantines and Death: The Far Right's Homophobic Agenda (Report). Atlanta: Center for Democratic Renewal. OCLC 21369303.
- —— (2009). Blood and Politics: The History of the White Nationalist Movement From the Margins to the Mainstream. New York: Farrar, Straus and Giroux. ISBN 978-0-374-10903-5.
- Burghart, Devin; —— (2010). Tea Party Nationalism: A Critical Examination of the Tea Party Movement and the Size, Scope, and Focus of Its National Factions (Report). Kansas City: Institute for Research & Education on Human Rights. OCLC 673733781.
- —— (July 2012). "A Nation Dispossessed: The Tea Party Movement and Race". Critical Sociology. 38 (4): 495–509. doi:10.1177/0896920511431852. ISSN 0896-9205.
- —— (2014). "The Tea Party Movement at the Crossroads of Nation and State". In Jackson, Paul; Shekhovtsov, Anton (eds.). The Post-War Anglo-American Far Right: A Special Relationship of Hate. Basingstoke: Palgrave Macmillan. pp. 104–121. ISBN 978-1-137-39621-1.
