= Touch assist =

Scientology technique

A Touch Assist is a Scientology procedure purported to heal illness or injury. It is one of many such Assists.

== Theory ==
Church of Scientology founder L. Ron Hubbard said that when one is in pain, "the energy from a shock will make a standing wave in the body." He went on to explain that the purpose of a "touch assist" is to "unlock the standing waves that are small electronic ridges of nervous energy that is not flowing as it should." This contradicts medical science's current conception of the nervous system, which holds that nerves transmit pain, and do not store it.

The Volunteer Minister's Handbook has a section on the Touch Assist, containing information taken from the Hubbard Communications Office Technical Bulletins (HCOBs), giving guidelines on how to perform a touch assist and explaining the underlying idea. The following quotes for example, are taken from HCOB 25 Aug 87 Issue II : "Every single physical illness stems from a failure to communicate with the thing or area that is ill." "When attention is withdrawn from an injured or ill body areas, so are circulation, nerve flows and energy. This limits nutrition to the area and prevents the drain of waste products."

According to the guidelines, "a touch assist may be done by anyone, on anyone." The person performing the touch assist must explain to the person who is ill how it works. Only once this is done this can he perform the actual touch assist, using one finger, not two ("If you used two fingers the (person) could be confused about which he was supposed to look at or feel."). Once this is done, he must tell the person "End of assist."

== Procedure ==
According to the 1994 edition of The Scientology Handbook, the person giving the assist is to instruct the person being assisted to "feel my finger" as they touch various points on his body, using one finger and one finger only. This continues across the entire body, balanced to both sides of it and "following the nerve channels". The Handbook goes on to say:

"A Touch Assist must include the extremities and the spine. A correctly done Touch Assist can speed the Thetan's ability to heal or repair a condition with his body." (pg.216)

The touch assist is not to be used to treat headaches, however:

"Do not do a Touch Assist on a person who has a headache. Research has shown that headaches are often the result of mental phenomena that a Touch Assist would be the incorrect handling for." (pg.218)

== Claims ==
In the Scientology book Assists for Illnesses and Injuries, testimonials are given by anonymous persons. One says: "I was under intensive care for weeks with a bleeding ulcer infection and kidney failure...The nurses did not expect me to live. But my wife came to the hospital everyday to give me assists...I am now recovered and would not have lived if it weren’t for the help many people gave me using the procedures developed by L. Ron Hubbard." Another says:

"I was working as a chimney sweep and had an accident in which I fell three stories, landing on my feet and breaking both of my heels. I went to the hospital where they prescribed painkillers and wanted to keep me overnight. Instead, I went home and my wife gave me a Touch Assist which handled the agony I was in, allowing me to sleep that night without painkillers. I received Touch Assists daily and by the end of that week, I was able to hobble around on crutches on my tiptoes. Then I received another type of assist after which something felt 'different' and when I stood up, I found I could easily stand on my feet without my crutches!"

== Criticism ==
Professional skeptic James Randi expressed displeasure with the idea of Scientology assists:

"Giving out only finger-pointing and touching? To a Scientologist, this may be believed to be a huge boon, but to the rest of us, it’s L. Ron Hubbard at his woo-woo best, devising magical gestures that are supposed to bring about the “miracles”...."

In 2006, when Volunteer Ministers from the Church set up a tent on campus at the University of New Mexico, the campus newspaper Daily Lobo reported:

"Rose Stevenson said she didn't mind the Scientologists being there. "It's college. This is what it's all about - having all your options presented to you," she said. "It's freedom of expression." However, she said the massage she received, called a touch assist, was ineffective at easing pain from a pinched nerve. "I was out of time, so I told him I felt something release," she said. "These people are really nice, but I don't think they know what they're doing."

== See also ==
- Faith healing
- Laying on of hands
- Reiki
