= L. Fletcher Prouty =

United States Air Force officer (1917–2001)

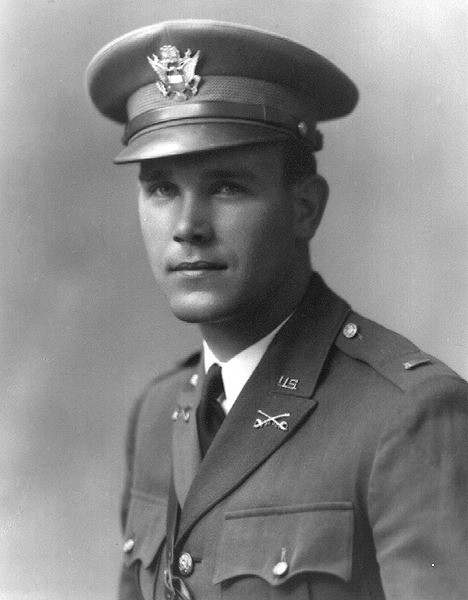
- Prouty in 1941
- Born: Leroy Fletcher Prouty; January 24, 1917; Springfield, Massachusetts, U.S.
- Died: June 5, 2001 (aged 84); McLean, Virginia, U.S.
- Burial place: Arlington National Cemetery
- Spouse: Elizabeth Ballinger (m. 1942)
- Children: 3
- Military career
- Allegiance: United States
- Branch: United States Air Force
- Service years: 1941–1964
- Rank: Colonel
- Conflicts: World War II
- Awards: Legion of Merit; Joint Service Commendation Medal

Signature
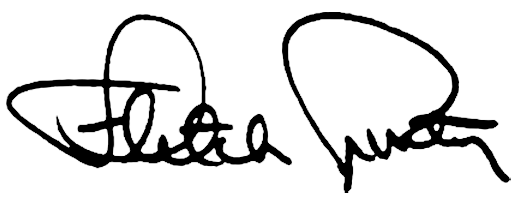

Leroy Fletcher Prouty (January 24, 1917 – June 5, 2001) served as Chief of Special Operations for the Joint Chiefs of Staff under President John F. Kennedy. A colonel in the United States Air Force, he retired from military service to become a bank executive. He subsequently became a critic of U.S. foreign policy, particularly the covert activities of the Central Intelligence Agency (CIA), which he believed was working on behalf of a secret world elite.

Prouty's commentary on the Kennedy assassination circulated widely from the 1970s to 1990s, as a key source for conspiracy theories about it. He was the inspiration for the character "X" in Oliver Stone's film JFK.

== Early life ==
Prouty was born in Springfield, Massachusetts on January 24, 1917, to Marie Ozias Desautels, age 32, and Leroy Fletcher Prouty, a municipal government employee, age 28. He was the first child in a growing family and would eventually become one of five, with two brothers and two sisters.

His first brother Robert Vincent was born one year later on May 9, 1918, and they were joined by a sister Muriel two years after that on September 28, 1920. Another baby girl joined the family on March 24, 1921, and was named Corinne Marie; she later went by Corinne Toole. The youngest of the Prouty children, a boy named Norman Peter, was born 1926. Corinne was his only sibling to survive him.

Prouty attended the University of Massachusetts Amherst (then known as Massachusetts State College), and on September 20, 1936, he was elected president of his freshman class, "the Class of 1940", succeeding Daniel G. Lacey. He later pursued his graduate studies in banking at the University of Wisconsin–Madison Graduate School of Banking.

Prouty belonged to a handful of membership organizations: the National Defense Transportation Association, the American Bankers Association, the Tokyo Toastmasters Club, and the Army Navy Club.

== Government service ==
=== World War II ===
Prouty was commissioned as a reserve second lieutenant in the cavalry on June 9, 1941, and began his military career with the 4th Armored Division in Pine Camp, New York. He was promoted to first lieutenant on February 1, 1942. He transferred to the United States Army Air Forces on November 10, 1942, and earned his pilot wings that same month. He arrived in British West Africa (specifically the British Gold Coast colony) in February 1943 as a pilot with Air Transport Command.

In the summer of 1943 he was the personal pilot of Generals Omar Bradley, John C. H. Lee, and C. R. Smith (founder and president of American Airlines), among others. He flew the U.S. Geological Survey Team in Saudi Arabia, October 1943, to confirm oil discoveries in preparation for the Cairo Conference. He was assigned to special duties at the Cairo Conference and the Tehran Conference from November to December 1943. He flew Chiang Kai-shek's Chinese delegation (T. V. Soong's delegates) to Tehran.

An important mission he was involved in was the evacuation of the British commandos made famous by the novel Guns of Navarone involved in the Battle of Leros from Leros to Palestine. He was promoted to captain on February 1, 1944. In 1945, he was transferred to the Southwest Pacific and flew in New Guinea, Leyte, and was on Okinawa at the end of war. He landed near Tokyo at the time of the surrender with the first three planes carrying General Douglas MacArthur's bodyguard troops. He flew out with American POWs.

=== Post-war service ===
After the war, Prouty accepted an assignment from the U.S. Army in September 1945 to inaugurate the ROTC program at Yale University, where he also taught during each scholastic year from 1946 to 1948. This timeline intersects with the years that George Bush and William F. Buckley, Jr. also spent at Yale. Prouty fondly recalled Buckley at that time in his role as editor of the Yale Daily News, and Prouty later told an interviewer in 1989 that he had written for Buckley on several occasions.

In 1950, he transferred to Colorado Springs to build Air Defense Command. From 1952 to 1954, he was assigned to Korean War duties in Japan, where he served as Military Manager for Tokyo International Airport (Haneda) during the post-war U.S. occupation.

In 1955, he was assigned to the coordination of operations between the U.S. Air Force and the CIA. As a result of a CIA commendation for this work he was awarded the Legion of Merit by the U.S. Air Force, promoted to colonel, and assigned to the Office of the Secretary of Defense.

Following the creation of the Defense Intelligence Agency and termination of the OSO by Secretary Robert McNamara, Prouty was transferred to the Office of the Joint Chiefs of Staff and charged with the creation a similar organization on a global scale.

From 1962 to 1963, he served as Chief of Special Operations with the Joint Staff. He would be delegated to Air Force Brigadier General Edward Lansdale, who in early 1961 became the Assistant to the Secretary of Defense for Special Operations. Lansdale later said Prouty was a "good pilot of prop-driven aircraft, but had such a heavy dose of paranoia about CIA when he was on my staff that I kicked him back to the Air Force." Rufus Phillips, who became famous for his insistence on telling the truth about American failures in Vietnam and for opposing the American escalation, later said Prouty was "a complete nut."

In a chance encounter with Edward Lansdale in the hallways of the Pentagon, a "month or two before" the assassination (as Prouty tells it), Lansdale informed Prouty he had arranged for him [Prouty] to accompany a group of VIPs to the South Pole from November 10 to 23, in the capacity of Military Escort officer. The ostensible purpose of the trip was the activation of a nuclear power plant at the U.S. Navy base at McMurdo Sound, Antarctica, to provide heat, light, and sea water desalination. Prouty later described his confusion at the unusual assignment, but he expected the job to be a "paid vacation" and accepted the task. The activation of the plant, PM-3A, actually occurred on 3 March 1962, a year and a half earlier than Prouty claimed.

Prouty retired in 1964 as a colonel in the U.S. Air Force. As recognition of his long and distinguished career in the service of his country, he was awarded one of the first three Joint Service Commendation Medals by General Maxwell D. Taylor, Chairman of the Joint Chiefs of Staff.

== Post-military ==
=== Railroads ===
He was a senior director of public affairs for Amtrak during the 1970s, and a director of the National Railroad Foundation and Museum. During this period he worked out of the Amtrak Corp. office in Washington, D.C.

=== Writing ===
Prouty authored two major books during his life, The Secret Team: The CIA and Its Allies in Control of the United States and the World in 1973 and JFK: The CIA, Vietnam, and the Plot to Assassinate John F. Kennedy in 1992.

He served alongside friend and fellow researcher Eustace Mullins as contributing editor for a conspiracy magazine titled Criminal Politics.

Prouty also published articles in a wide variety of publications, from pornographic magazines to peer-reviewed journals to academic textbooks, illustrating the wide diversity in his intended audiences for different writings. His areas of expertise were cultivated by direct experience as well as research, and they range from railroads to assassinations to transportation to military strategy and logistics.

His writings even include entries on Railroad Engineering and Foreign Railroad Technology for McGraw-Hill's Scientific Encyclopedias and Scientific Yearbooks, as well as contributions to ROTC textbooks.

Prouty wrote the introduction to Mark Lane's 1991 book Plausible Denial.

=== Church of Scientology ===
In the early 1980s, Prouty's services as an expert witness were retained by the legal team of the Church of Scientology to act as consultant in the investigation of L. Ron Hubbard's military record.

By early 1985, Hubbard's naval record was again the subject of increasing scrutiny. Julie Christofferson Titchbourne of Portland, Oregon brought her case against the Church at that time, and Scientology's lawyers again turned to Prouty to help them manage the public relations fallout. Prouty was forthcoming with an affidavit on their behalf by February. In it, he stated his belief that the records released by the U.S. Navy documenting Hubbard's service in the armed forces "are incomplete ... those materials and records provided give ample evidence that proves the existence of other records that have been concealed, withheld and overlooked."

...to provide proof of the fact that the records, data and related materials provided by the U.S. Navy (USN) and other government sources, all said to be the complete record and file on the military service, active and inactive, of Mr. L. Ronald Hubbard, formerly Lt. Commander, U.S. Navy Reserve, are incomplete ... [and] to attest to the fact that those materials and records provided give ample evidence that proves the existence of other records that have been concealed, withheld and overlooked.

Hubbard, the founder of Scientology, had said that he sustained combat injuries during his military service in World War II and that he healed himself through measures that would become Dianetics. However, Hubbard's military record does not show that he was wounded in combat. Church officials have stated that those records were incomplete and may have been falsified. Prouty, according to Church of Scientology spokesman Tommy Davis, reported that Hubbard was an intelligence agent, and because of this his military discharge papers were "sheep dipped", meaning two sets of government records were created documenting Hubbard's service.

Prouty's association with Scientology also provided him with a platform for his writing over the following decades, serving as senior editor of Freedom magazine, an official publication of the Church. Between 1985 and 1987, Freedom published a 19-part series by Prouty which it described as having "provided a unique and highly informative view of the events which led up to the Vietnam War." The magazine later covered his perspective on the Jonestown affair. At times, he has described himself as "an editorial adviser to publications of the Church of Scientology."

=== Oliver Stone's JFK film ===
Prouty served as a technical adviser to Oliver Stone's 1991 film JFK. He was the inspiration for the mysterious "Mr. X" (played by Donald Sutherland), who assists Jim Garrison in the movie.

== Personal life and death ==
Prouty married Elizabeth Ballinger on October 5, 1942, and with her he fathered three children: David Fletcher, Jane Elizabeth, and Lauren Michele.

Colonel Prouty died on June 5, 2001, at the Inova Alexandria Hospital in Alexandria, Virginia. Age 84, he died of organ failure following stomach surgery. His funeral service was held the next day at the Fort Myer Chapel, and he was subsequently buried at Arlington National Cemetery in Arlington, Virginia.

== Controversy ==
As a critic of the CIA, Prouty pointed out its influence in global matters, outside the realm of U.S. congressional and government oversight. His works detailed the formation and development of the CIA, the origins of the Cold War, the U-2 incident, the Vietnam War, and the John F. Kennedy assassination. Prouty wrote that he believed Kennedy's assassination was a coup d'état, and that there is a secret, global "power elite", which operates covertly to protect its interests, and in doing so has frequently subverted democracy around the world. According to the journalist Max Boot,

He also claimed that the fall of the Berlin Wall was stage-managed by David Rockefeller to profit from "the rubles and the gold", that he had personally seen a UFO, and that "the Churchill gang" murdered Franklin D. Roosevelt.

=== Alexander Butterfield ===
On July 12, 1975, prior to closed-door questioning by the staff of the House Select Intelligence Committee, Prouty told reporters that presidential aide Alexander Butterfield was a contact for the CIA at the White House. He said he had learned the information over four years earlier from E. Howard Hunt while doing work for the National League of Families. Prouty said that most federal government departments, including the Internal Revenue Service and the Treasury Department, had similar CIA contacts, and that he assumed that former president Richard Nixon was aware of Butterfield's role. However, Senator Frank Church chair of the Senate Select Committee on Intelligence Activities, said the committee had found no evidence that the CIA planted an undercover agent within the White House or other government agencies.

A few days later, Prouty partially walked back his comments in a telephone interview: "They may have told me the wrong name in order to cover up the real informer." In a telephone statement to UPI that same day, Butterfield called the allegations "wholly false and defamatory" and stated that he had never met nor seen Hunt and had just recently heard of Prouty. In an interview with CBS News from Eglin Air Force Base where he was serving his prison term for his involvement in the Watergate scandal, Hunt denied the allegation calling it an "unfortunate invention on Mr. Prouty's part." Also interviewed by CBS, Prouty again stated it was Hunt who told him about Butterfield.

In a personal letter sent to Roger Feinman at CBS News Radio on July 14, 1975, researcher Harold Weisberg expressed his belief that "the clear inference of the Prouty connection is that as a CIA man Butterfield pulled the plug on Nixon."

On July 19, Church said that his committee found that there was "no scintilla of evidence" to support Prouty's allegations, and that his committee had ruled out the possibility that Butterfield served as a liaison officer for the CIA. Church also stated, "on close interrogation, Mr. Prouty is unable to substantiate his earlier statement and acknowledges this to be the case."

=== Kennedy assassination ===
According to Prouty, people within the intelligence and military communities of the United States government conspired to assassinate Kennedy. He maintained that their actions were a coup d'état to stop the President from taking control of the CIA after the Bay of Pigs Invasion. Prouty stated that the assassination was orchestrated by Edward Lansdale ("General Y" in Oliver Stone's film JFK) and that Lansdale appeared in photographs of the "three tramps". (Note: The historian Max Boot would be highly critical of the General Y story: "Lansdale... was a critic, not an advocate, of the Americanization of the Vietnam War. He was never a proponent of expensive weapons systems; he argued that the best weapon was a well-trained soldier, diplomat, or spy who would deal sympathetically with the local populace...A staunch advocate of spreading liberty abroad, Lansdale was scarcely likely to undermine liberty at home by participating in a military coup d'état against the lawfully elected president—a man he had worked for and respected, even if he was less enamored of the president's younger brother.... Far from plotting to kill John F. Kennedy, as numerous conspiracy-mongers continue to allege, Lansdale was as grief-stricken as the rest of the country by his shocking death and as uncertain about what would come next.")

In 1975, Prouty appeared with Richard Sprague at a news conference in New York to present what they believed was photographic evidence of a conspiracy. According to Prouty, the movement of Kennedy after a bullet struck his head was consistent with a shot from the grassy knoll. He also suggested that the actions of a man with an umbrella, the "Umbrella Man", were suspicious. In 1988 he made an appearance in the documentary The Men Who Killed Kennedy. He was also interviewed for the documentaries The JFK Assassination: The Jim Garrison Tapes and Beyond 'JFK': The Question of Conspiracy, both released in 1992.

=== 1960 U-2 incident ===
In his 1973 book The Secret Team, Prouty provided an alternative view of the 1960 U-2 incident. He charged that the flight was sabotaged in such a way by anticommunist elements in our government as to cause the U-2 to lose altitude mid-flight, allowing the Soviets to shoot it down. Prouty believed the ultimate purpose of the operation was the engineering of the subsequent international incident that put an end to the increasingly amicable U.S.–Soviet relations and doomed any hope for a positive outcome between Khrushchev and Eisenhower at the Four Power Paris Summit set to begin May 16. The summit began as scheduled but quickly collapsed as a result of fallout from the incident. William Blum made his own case for Prouty's version of events in his own book, Killing Hope, published in 2008.

Prouty's version of events was rejected by former CIA director Richard Helms, Richard Bissell, Walter Pfoigheimer, and other career officers of the Central Intelligence Agency. Helms commented that "I simply don't believe that Prouty is accurate. There is no substance to the charge." Bissell later claimed that Prouty was not authorized for access to U-2 information and said, "I don't see what information there could have been aboard that aircraft that could have helped the Russians" to bring down Powers' U-2.

=== Antisemitic associations ===
Prouty was a featured speaker at the 1990 convention of the Liberty Lobby. Prouty was also named to the advisory board for the Lobby's Populist Action Committee. Prouty also sold the reprint rights for The Secret Team to the Noontide Press, the publishing arm for the Institute for Historical Review, a holocaust denial organization.

Prouty denied having known of the racist and antisemitic associations of the Lobby, noted that he also spoke at a ceremony at the United States Holocaust Memorial Museum, and assured Oliver Stone "... that he was neither a racist nor an anti-Semite... but merely a writer in need of a platform." In a response to an article about Prouty in Esquire, which he labeled a "character assassination", Stone lamented Prouty's association with the Liberty Lobby but questioned its relevance to Prouty's reliability as a source. In an obituary in The Guardian, Michael Carlson wrote that "[a]lthough Prouty himself never espoused such [anti-semitic] beliefs, the connection enabled critics to dismiss his later writings."

Prouty became a supporter of conspiracy theorist and antisemite Lyndon LaRouche. When LaRouche was convicted in 1988 of conspiracy and mail fraud Prouty likened it to the trial of Socrates.

== Awards ==
Prouty was awarded many decorations during his distinguished career in national and public service:

- Command Pilot Wings
- Office of the Secretary of Defense Identification Badge
- Office of the Joint Chiefs of Staff Identification Badge
- Legion of Merit
- Joint Service Commendation Medal
- American Defense Service Medal
- American Campaign Medal
- European-African-Middle Eastern Campaign Medal
- Asiatic-Pacific Campaign Medal
- World War II Victory Medal
- Army of Occupation Medal with "Japan" clasp
- Korean Service Medal
- National Defense Service Medal with star
- Air Force Longevity Service Ribbon with four oak leaf clusters
- Philippine Liberation Medal
- United Nations Korea Medal

== Bibliography ==
External videos
- Col. Prouty delivers a lecture in Portland following the release of the JFK film by Oliver Stone and his own book by the same title (1993), via YouTube. 116 mins.

=== Books ===
- The Secret Team: The CIA and Its Allies in Control of the United States and the World, Englewood Cliffs, NJ: Prentice-Hall (1973). ISBN 0137981732. Full text.
- JFK: The CIA, Vietnam, and the Plot to Assassinate John F. Kennedy. Introduction by Oliver Stone. New York: Birch Lane Press (1992). ISBN 1559721308. Full text.

=== Book contributions ===
- "Anatomy of Assassination" in: Uncloaking the CIA. Conference on the CIA and World Peace at Yale University (1975).
- "Kennedy's Policy on Vietnam Led to His Murder" in: Assassination of John F. Kennedy, San Diego, CA: Greenhaven Press (2003). ISBN 978-0737713558, 978-0737713541.
- Introduction to Lane, Mark (1991). Plausible Denial. Thunder's Mouth Press. ISBN 978-1560250005.

=== Encyclopedic ===
- "Railroad Engineering", McGraw-Hill Scientific Encyclopedia
- "Foreign Railroad Technology" in: McGraw-Hill Scientific Yearbook-1982

=== Articles ===
- "The Secret Team and the Games They Play", The Washington Monthly, May 1970

=== Letters to the editor ===
Letters

- "U-2 Shootdowns", Air Force Magazine, vol. 79, no. 4 (Apr. 1996). Full issue

Remarks on the 1960 U-2 incident involving Francis Gary Powers

Replies

- Prouty's reply to "The Umbrella Man" (letter), by David R. Gallery (May 1976)

== Filmography ==
=== Documentaries ===
- World in Action [series] (Jun. 16–30, 1975)
  - "The Rise and Fall of the CIA (Part 1)" Season 11, Episode 38 (June 16, 1975)
  - "The Rise and Fall of the CIA (Part 3)" Season 11, Episode 40 (June 30, 1975)
- The Secret Government: The Constitution in Crisis (1987). Special Report by Bill Moyers
- Who Killed Martin Luther King? (1989). Written and directed by John Edginton for BBC. Emmy-nominated.
- The Men Who Killed Kennedy (1991). Directed by Nigel Turner.
- The JFK Assassination: The Jim Garrison Tapes (1992). Written and directed by John Barbour.
- The JFK Conspiracy (Apr. 15, 1992). Hosted by James Earl Jones. Written and directed by Daniel Helfgott.
- Beyond 'JFK': The Question of Conspiracy (1992). Directed by Barbara Kopple and Danny Schechter. Features Carl Oglesby.

=== Media appearances ===
- Tomorrow with Tom Snyder: JFK Assassination. NBC (April 15, 1975) [56 min.]

One in this series of late-night topical interview programs hosted by Tom Snyder. This installment, occurring on the 110th anniversary of Abraham Lincoln's death, focuses on the assassination of President John F. Kennedy and the many ongoing questions surrounding his death. Panelists include: forensic pathologist Cyril Wecht, attorney Bernard Fensterwald, and retired Air Force Colonel L. Fletcher Prouty, who served as Chief of Special Operations for the Joint Chiefs of Staff under Kennedy.

== Interviews ==
- "An Interview with Colonel Fletcher Prouty" [audio]. All Things Considered... NPR (March 22, 1973)
- Alan Douglas Show [video]. (April 12, 1973)
- Who's On the Secret Team? [audio]. Interviewed by Paul McIsaac, Nanette Rainone and Carl Oglesby. Pacifica Radio Archives (December 11, 1973). 110 min. catalog.
- Gray, Marvin L. (Jr). "Staff Interview", Counsel for the Presidents Commission on CIA Activities. [print]. Washington, D.C. (May 15, 1975)
- Kanier, Bruce. Interview video (October 12, 1994)
- Schorr, Dan. Interview [video]. CBS (July 11, 1975)
- Ratcliffe, David T. "Understanding Special Operations and Their Impact on the Vietnam War Era: 1989 Interview with L. Fletcher Prouty" [audio]. Rat Haus Reality Press (1989)
  - Audio recording of "Understanding The Secret Team in the Post-World War II Era" (May 6, 1989)
  - Audio recording of "A Very Special Operation: The Assassination of President Kennedy" (May 8, 1989)
- The Mind of L. Fletcher Prouty [video] (1992).

Produced by Jim Grapek for Prevailing Winds Research, this interview was conducted by John Judge and took place in Colonel Prouty's home in Alexandria, Virginia.

- Steinberg, Jeffrey. "'President Kennedy Was Killed by a Murder, Inc.'" [print]. Executive Intelligence Review, vol. 19, no. 6 (February 7, 1992), pp. 34–38. Full issue.
- Steinberg, Jeffrey.Exclusive Interview with "Mr. X" (a.k.a. Col Prouty) [video] The LaRouche Connection (November 11, 1992)
- James, Gary. "An Interview with 'Mr. X.'" [print]. Table Hoppers, vol. 1, no. 1 (March 30, 1995)
- Wray, Tim, and Jeremy Gunn, Christopher Barger, Joan Zimmerman. Interview with L. Fletcher Prouty. Summary prepared by Christopher Barger on October 23, 1996 [print]. Assassination Records Review Board (September 24, 1996)
- Meet Mr. X: The Personality & Thoughts of Fletcher Prouty [video]. (2001) 11 min.

This interview session is featured on the 2-disc JFK: Special Edition, released on DVD in 2001.
