= Jean Hardisty =

American political scientist (1945–2015)

- Born: Jean Virginia Hardisty; June 18, 1945; Washington, D.C., U.S.
- Died: March 16, 2015 (aged 69); Somerville, Massachusetts, U.S.
- Occupations: Political scientist, activist
- Organization: Political Research Associates

Jean Virginia Hardisty (June 18, 1945 – March 16, 2015) was a political scientist and lesbian progressive activist who became a national resource for human rights movements seeking social and economic justice and an end to bigotry based on race, gender, or class. She was a senior scholar with the Wellesley Centers for Women. Hardisty founded the progressive political think tank Political Research Associates.

== Early life and education ==
Jean Virginia Hardisty was born June 18, 1945, and was born and raised in Washington, D.C., in an upper-middle class family. Her family later moved to Anne Arundel County, Maryland. She was the younger of two children. Hardisty received her Bachelors of Arts degree in art history from Northwestern University Master's degrees in political science from University of Southern California. received a PhD in political science in 1976 from Northwestern University in Illinois.

== Career ==
She taught at the university level for an eight year period. In the 1980s, she left academia to conduct a study of the anti-feminist women's movement for the American Civil Liberties Union of Illinois. She predicted a massive organized right-wing backlash which saw the rise of the New Right and the election of Ronald Reagan as president in 1980.

In 1981, she then founded the progressive think tank Midwest Research in Chicago, which became Political Research Associates in Massachusetts in 1987. It was established to study right-wing movements nationwide. She worked as an adviser to the legal team that overturned Colorado Amendment 43.

She was a senior scholar with the Wellesley Centers for Women. She served on the boards of the Ms. Foundation for Women, the Sister Fund, the Highlander Research and Education Center, the Center for Community Change, and the Women's Community Cancer Project. She was an education consultant to the Ms. Foundation Democracy Funding Circle. Hardisty served for many years on the board of the Civil Liberties Union of Massachusetts.

She received a Lifetime Achievement Award from the Center for Community Change and has been inducted into The City of Chicago Gay and Lesbian Hall of Fame.

Hardisty is listed in the Chicago LGBT Hall of Fame.

== Writings ==
She authored Mobilizing Resentment: Conservative Resurgence from the John Birch Society to the Promise Keepers, published by Beacon Press in 1999. It focuses on far right politics and criticizes the ideology of the far-right; reviews of the book were mixed, with praise for some of her arguments but criticisms of others. She also authored reports for PRA.

Articles by Hardisty have appeared in The Nation magazine, The Women's Review of Books, The Public Eye, and other publications.

== Personal life and death ==
Hardisty was a lesbian. Before realizing she was a lesbian, she married a man. She married Peggy Barrett in 2013, having been her long term partner for over a decade.

In 1985, she was diagnosed with non-Hodgkins lymphoma. Her cancer was successfully treated and she went into remission for 25 years. Hardisty died on March 16, 2015, in Somerville, Massachusetts, after her non-Hodgkins lymphoma returned.

== Selected publications ==
- Mobilizing Resentment: Conservative Resurgence From The John Birch Society To The Promise Keepers. Boston: Beacon Press. 1999. ISBN 978-0-8070-4317-2.
- Rights for Some: The Erosion of U.S. Democracy: A Report from Political Research Associates. Somerville: Political Research Associates. 2001.
- Pushed to the Altar: The Right Wing Roots of Marriage Promotion. Somerville, Mass.: Political Research Associates; Women of Color Resource Center. 2008. ISBN 978-0-9159-8720-7.
- Between a Rock and a Hard Place: Race and Child Care in Mississippi. Somerville, Mass.: Political Research Associates. 2013. ISBN 978-0-9159-8730-6.
