= Ronald Reagan judicial appointment controversies =

During President Ronald Reagan's presidency, he nominated two people for the Supreme Court and at least twelve people for various federal appellate judgeships who were not confirmed. In some cases, the nominations were not processed by the Democratic-controlled Senate Judiciary Committee before Reagan's presidency ended, while in other cases, nominees were rejected by the Senate Judiciary Committee or even blocked by unfriendly members of the Republican Party. Three of the nominees were renominated by Reagan's successor, President George H. W. Bush. Two of the nominees, Ferdinand Francis Fernandez and Guy G. Hurlbutt, were nominated after July 1, 1988, the traditional start date of the unofficial Thurmond Rule during a presidential election year. Eight of the thirteen seats eventually were filled by appointees of President George H. W. Bush.

== List of unsuccessful federal judicial nominations ==
Reagan made 32 nominations for federal judgeships that were not confirmed by the Senate. Of these, one, Robert Bork, was rejected by the Senate and 9 were withdrawn by Reagan, while the other 22 expired at an adjournment of the Senate, including 16 that were pending at the close of the 100th Congress. Seven of his unsuccessful nominees were subsequently nominated to federal judgeships by other presidents, and all 7 were confirmed.

Nominee	Court	Nomination date	Date of final action	Final action	Subsequent federal judicial nominations	Seat filled by	Ref.
Supreme Court
Robert Bork	SCOTUS	July 7, 1987	October 23, 1987	rejected by the Senate		Anthony Kennedy	
Douglas H. Ginsburg	SCOTUS	October 30, 1987	November 9, 1987	returned to the president		Anthony Kennedy	
Courts of appeals
Sherman Unger	Fed. Cir.	December 15, 1982	November 22, 1983	returned to the president		Jean Galloway Bissell	
Paul M. Bator	D.C. Cir.	August 1, 1984	September 6, 1984	withdrawn by Pres. Reagan		Laurence Silberman	
Bernard Siegan	9th Cir.	February 2, 1987	September 16, 1988	withdrawn by Pres. Reagan		Ferdinand Fernandez	
Susan Liebeler	Fed. Cir.	March 23, 1987	October 22, 1988	returned to the president		S. Jay Plager	
Dave Treen	5th Cir.	July 22, 1987	May 10, 1988	withdrawn by Pres. Reagan		John M. Duhé Jr.	
Stuart A. Summit	2nd Cir.	September 23, 1987	October 22, 1988	returned to the president		John M. Walker Jr.	
Judith Richards Hope	D.C. Cir.	April 14, 1988	October 22, 1988	returned to the president		Clarence Thomas	
Pamela Ann Rymer	9th Cir.	April 26, 1988	October 22, 1988	returned to the president	9th Cir. (nominated February 28, 1989, confirmed May 18,1989)	Herself	
Jacques L. Wiener Jr.	5th Cir.	June 27, 1988	October 22, 1988	returned to the president	5th Cir. (nominated November 17, 1989, confirmed May 9, 1990)	Himself	
Guy G. Hurlbutt	9th Cir.	August 11, 1988	October 22, 1988	returned to the president		Thomas G. Nelson	
Ferdinand Fernandez	9th Cir.	September 16, 1988	October 22, 1988	returned to the president	9th Cir. (nominated February 28, 1989, confirmed May 18,1989)	Himself	
District courts
Morton R. Galane	D. Nev.	July 21, 1983	October 18, 1983	withdrawn by Pres. Reagan		Lloyd D. George	
Albert I. Moon Jr.	D. Haw.	October 16, 1985	January 2, 1986	returned to the president		Alan Cooke Kay	
Jeff Sessions	S.D. Ala.	October 23, 1985	July 31, 1986	withdrawn by Pres. Reagan		Alex T. Howard Jr.	
James Kenneth Porter	E.D. Tenn.	July 30, 1986	October 18, 1986	returned to the president		Robert Leon Jordan	
Robert N. Miller	D. Colo.	February 5, 1987	February 2, 1988	withdrawn by Pres. Reagan		Edward Nottingham	
Robert Roberto Jr.	E.D.N.Y.	November 25, 1987	July 26, 1988	withdrawn by Pres. Reagan		Arthur Spatt	
Vaughn Walker	N.D. Cal.	December 19, 1987	October 22, 1988	returned to the president	N.D. Cal. (nominated February 28, 1989, confirmed November 22, 1989)	Himself	
Alfred C. Schmutzer Jr.	E.D. Tenn.	December 19, 1987	March 28, 1988	withdrawn by Pres. Reagan		Robert Leon Jordan	
Howard E. Levitt	E.D.N.Y.	December 22, 1987	October 22, 1988	returned to the president		Carol Amon	
Donald E. Abram	D. Colo.	February 19, 1988	October 22, 1988	returned to the president		Edward Nottingham	
Shannon T. Mason Jr.	E.D. Va.	February 22, 1988	October 22, 1988	returned to the president		Rebecca Beach Smith	
James R. McGregor	W.D. Pa.	March 14, 1988	October 22, 1988	returned to the president		Donald J. Lee	
William H. Erickson	D. Colo.	March 23, 1988	October 22, 1988	returned to the president		Daniel B. Sparr	
Robert C. Bonner	C.D. Cal.	June 15, 1988	October 22, 1988	returned to the president	C.D. Cal. (nominated February 28, 1989, confirmed May 18, 1989)	Himself	
Melinda Harmon	S.D. Tex.	June 23, 1988	October 22, 1988	returned to the president	S.D. Tex. (nominated February 28, 1989, confirmed May 18, 1989)	Herself	
Marvin J. Garbis	D. Md.	July 6, 1988	October 22, 1988	returned to the president	D. Md. (nominated August 4, 1989, confirmed October 24, 1989)	Himself	
Article I courts
J. Harlan Stamper Jr.	T.C.	July 12, 1982	September 23, 1982	withdrawn by Pres. Reagan		Charles Clapp	
Joseph V. Colaianni	Cl. Ct.	November 19, 1982	December 27, 1982	returned to the president		Loren A. Smith	
Robert Charrow	Cl. Ct.	February 2, 1987	August 10, 1987	returned to the president		Randall Ray Rader	
Article IV courts
Adriane J. Dudley	D.V.I.	June 20, 1988	October 22, 1988	returned to the president		Thomas K. Moore	

== Failed nominees ==
- Supreme Court of the United States
  - Seat 1 – Robert Bork (rejected 42–58 by Senate)
  - Seat 1 – Douglas Ginsburg (withdrew before nomination was submitted; seat later filled by Reagan nominee Anthony Kennedy)
- United States Court of Appeals for the Second Circuit
  - New York seat – Stuart A. Summit (judgeship later filled by George H. W. Bush nominee John M. Walker, Jr.)
- United States Court of Appeals for the Fifth Circuit
  - Louisiana seat – David C. Treen (judgeship later filled by Reagan nominee John Malcolm Duhé, Jr.)
  - Louisiana seat – Jacques L. Wiener, Jr. (judgeship later filled by George H. W. Bush; Wiener was renominated for the seat by Bush)
  - Texas seat – Lino Graglia (judgeship later filled by Reagan nominee Jerry Edwin Smith)
- United States Court of Appeals for the Seventh Circuit
  - Indiana seat – William F. Harvey (judgeship later filled by Reagan nominee Kenneth Ripple)
- United States Court of Appeals for the Ninth Circuit
  - California seat – Bernard Siegan (judgeship later filled by George H. W. Bush nominee Ferdinand Francis Fernandez)
  - California seat – Ferdinand Francis Fernandez (judgeship later filled by George H. W. Bush; Fernandez was renominated for the seat by Bush)
  - California seat – Pamela Ann Rymer (judgeship later filled by George H. W. Bush; Rymer was renominated for the seat by Bush)
  - Idaho seat – Guy G. Hurlbutt (judgeship later filled by George H. W. Bush nominee Thomas G. Nelson)
- United States Court of Appeals for the District of Columbia Circuit
  - Seat – Judith Richards Hope (judgeship later filled by George H. W. Bush nominee Clarence Thomas)
- United States Court of Appeals for the Federal Circuit
  - Seat – Susan Liebeler (judgeship later filled by George H. W. Bush nominee S. Jay Plager)
  - Seat – Sherman Unger (judgeship later filled by Reagan nominee Jean Galloway Bissell)

== Others who were considered for nomination ==
In 1981, Reagan strongly and publicly had considered nominating Hallmark Cards attorney Judith Whittaker, who is the daughter-in-law of the late Supreme Court associate justice Charles Evans Whittaker, to a vacancy on the United States Court of Appeals for the Eighth Circuit that had been created by the decision by Floyd Robert Gibson to take senior status. Whittaker, a Republican, was dropped from consideration in December 1982 before being formally nominated, amid grassroots concerns among conservatives about Whittaker’s support of the Equal Rights Amendment and published rumors suggesting that she favored abortion rights. Ultimately, the White House nominated John R. Gibson in 1982 to the seat, and he was confirmed by the United States Senate.

In 1982, Reagan strongly and publicly had considered nominating New Orleans lawyer Ben C. Toledano to a seat on the United States Court of Appeals for the Fifth Circuit to replace Robert A. Ainsworth Jr., who had died in 1981. Toledano was recommended for the position by Louisiana’s Republican leadership, including then Governor David C. Treen. However, Toledano’s nomination was opposed by local and state chapters of the National Association for the Advancement of Colored People and a local group of African-American attorneys, who cited Toledano’s involvement in his twenties as an active supporter of racial segregation and his efforts to organize the segregationist States' Rights Party of Louisiana. (A number of prominent Louisiana blacks supported the nomination.) In December 1982, Reagan’s Counsel to the President, Fred Fielding, wrote in a memo that the joint White House-Justice Department working group “has identified Benjamin C. Toledano ... as a well-qualified candidate for nomination to the existing vacancy on the 5th Circuit Court of Appeals. However, we believe the facts described below should be brought to your personal attention before further action occurs on the part of this prospective nominee.” Fielding’s memo described Toledano’s past and the opposition to his nomination by a committee of the American Bar Association. Several days later, the White House informed Toledano that it would not proceed with his nomination, and evidence shows that Reagan himself personally made the decision. Reagan wound up nominating W. Eugene Davis to the seat, and he was confirmed in 1983.

== Failed nomination of Jeff Sessions to district court ==
In 1986, Reagan nominated Jeff Sessions to be a judge of the U.S. District Court for the Southern District of Alabama. Sessions' nomination was recommended and actively backed by Alabama Republican Senator Jeremiah Denton. A substantial majority of the American Bar Association Standing Committee on the Federal Judiciary, which rates nominees to the federal bench, rated Sessions "qualified", with a minority voting that Sessions was "not qualified".

At Sessions' confirmation hearings before the Senate Judiciary Committee, four Department of Justice lawyers who had worked with Sessions testified that he had made several racist statements. One of those lawyers, J. Gerald Hebert, testified that Sessions had referred to the National Association for the Advancement of Colored People (NAACP) and the American Civil Liberties Union (ACLU) as "un-American" and "Communist-inspired" because they "forced civil rights down the throats of people". Thomas Figures, a black Assistant U.S. Attorney, testified that Sessions said he thought the Ku Klux Klan was "OK until I found out they smoked pot". Sessions later said that the comment was not serious, but apologized for it. Figures also testified that on one occasion, when the Civil Rights Division sent the office instructions to investigate a case that Sessions had tried to close, Figures and Sessions "had a very spirited discussion regarding how the Hodge case should then be handled; in the course of that argument, Mr. Sessions threw the file on a table, and remarked, "I wish I could decline on all of them,"" by which Figures said Sessions meant civil rights cases generally. After becoming Ranking Member of the Judiciary Committee, Sessions was asked in an interview about his civil rights record as a U.S. Attorney. He denied that he had not sufficiently pursued civil rights cases, saying that "when I was [a U.S. Attorney], I signed 10 pleadings attacking segregation or the remnants of segregation, where we as part of the Department of Justice, we sought desegregation remedies." Figures also said that Sessions had called him "boy". He also testified that Sessions "admonished me to 'be careful what you say to white folks.'" Sessions was also reported to have called a white civil rights attorney a "disgrace to his race".

Sessions responded to the testimony by denying the allegations, saying his remarks were taken out of context or meant in jest, and also stating that groups could be considered un-American when "they involve themselves in un-American positions" on foreign policy. Sessions said during testimony that he considered the Klan to be "a force for hatred and bigotry". In regards to the marijuana quote, Sessions said the comment was a joke but apologized.

In response to a question from Joe Biden on whether he had called the NAACP and other civil rights organizations "un-American", Sessions replied "I'm often loose with my tongue. I may have said something about the NAACP being un-American or Communist, but I meant no harm by it."

On June 5, 1986, the committee voted 10–8 against recommending the nomination, with Republican Senators Charles Mathias of Maryland and Arlen Specter of Pennsylvania voting with the Democrats. It then split 9—9 on a vote to send Sessions' nomination to the Senate floor with no recommendation, this time with Specter in support. A majority was required for the nomination to proceed. The pivotal votes against Sessions came from his home state's Democratic Senator Howell Heflin. Although Heflin had previously backed Sessions, he began to oppose Sessions after hearing testimony, concluding that there were "reasonable doubts" over Sessions' ability to be fair and impartial. The nomination was withdrawn on July 31, 1986. Sessions became only the second nominee to the federal judiciary in 48 years whose nomination was killed by the Senate Judiciary Committee. The seat would be filled by another Reagan nominee Alex T. Howard Jr.

Sessions was later elected to the U.S. Senate in 1996, and re-elected in 2002, 2008 and 2014, and in November 2016 became President Donald Trump's nominee for Attorney General.

== See also ==
- Ronald Reagan Supreme Court candidates
- United States federal judge
- Judicial appointment history for United States federal courts
- Deaths of United States federal judges in active service
