= Bernard Siegan =

American law professor (1924–2006)

Bernard Herbert Siegan (July 28, 1924 – March 27, 2006) was a longtime law professor at the University of San Diego School of Law, libertarian legal theorist and a former federal judicial nominee to the United States Court of Appeals for the Ninth Circuit. The New York Times called Siegan's nomination "one of the most bitterly disputed judicial nominations of the Reagan Era."

== Early life and education ==
Born in Chicago, Siegan attended Marshall High School in Chicago, and served in the United States Army during World War II. Siegan earned a J.D. degree from the University of Chicago Law School in 1949.

== Professional and academic career ==
Siegan practiced law in Chicago from 1949 until 1973. In 1973, he became Professor of Law at the University of San Diego School of Law, where he taught for more than thirty years, becoming Distinguished Professor of Law. There, he taught constitutional law, and on the interaction of economics and the law, hosting guest lectures from such figures as former Chief Justice of the U.S. Supreme Court Warren Burger, Supreme Court Justice Antonin Scalia, former U.S. Attorney General Edwin Meese, and Nobel laureate James M. Buchanan. A participant in numerous academic and professional conferences, in 1983, for example, he spoke at The Thomas Jefferson School, a conference of intellectuals discussing Objectivism organized by economist George Reisman.

Siegan served on the National Commission on the Bicentennial of the Constitution (along with figures such as Senator Ted Kennedy), as a member of President Ronald Reagan's Commission on Housing, and as a consultant to the U.S. Department of Justice, the Department of Housing and Urban Development, and the Federal Trade Commission. After withdrawing his name from nomination to the federal judiciary, he led the U.S. Advisory Team on Bulgarian Growth and Transition, authoring its recommendations for a proposed Bulgarian Constitution following the fall of the Iron Curtain.

Siegan's work has been favorably cited by legal scholars such as Richard Epstein.

== Nomination to the Ninth Circuit ==
On February 2, 1987, President Ronald Reagan nominated Siegan, who was a close friend of then-Attorney General Edwin Meese, to the United States Court of Appeals for the Ninth Circuit to fill the seat vacated by Judge Warren J. Ferguson, who had taken senior status. Almost immediately, Siegan's nomination ran into opposition from liberals and even some conservatives because of his libertarian views on economic matters, and on property rights in particular. Siegan also had held the position that the U.S. Supreme Court had erred in major civil rights rulings. The nomination was followed by one of the longest delays by the U.S. Senate Judiciary Committee in addressing any judicial nomination in U.S. history up to that point. One of the loudest opponents to Siegan's nomination was Harvard Law School Professor Laurence Tribe, whose view toward Siegan softened years later.

Siegan had confirmation hearings before the Senate Judiciary Committee on November 5, 1987, and again on February 25, 1988, but his senatorial opponents were not satisfied by the answers that he gave. Although Reagan administration officials had told Siegan in early 1988 that he had no chance of being confirmed, Siegan refused to withdraw, preferring instead to proceed with a vote from the Senate Judiciary Committee. On July 14, 1988, his nomination was defeated by the Senate Judiciary Committee, which voted 8–6 not to report his nomination favorably (an almost unheard-of action), and deadlocked 7–7 on whether to forward the nomination to the full Senate without a recommendation. Siegan himself formally withdrew his nomination on September 16, 1988.

Reagan later nominated Ferdinand Francis Fernandez to the seat, although he did so after the traditional start date of the Thurmond Rule in a presidential election year, and Fernandez's nomination was not acted upon by senators before the 100th Congress adjourned. President George H. W. Bush opted not to renominate Siegan to the seat either, instead renominating Ferdinand Francis Fernandez to the seat in 1989. Fernandez was confirmed that same year.

== Death ==
Siegan suffered a stroke in 2005 and died on March 27, 2006, in Encinitas, California, of complications from that stroke.

== Selected works ==
- Land Use Without Zoning. Lexington Books. 1972. ISBN 978-0-669-82040-9.(ISBN 978-0669820409)
- Siegan, Bernard H., ed. (1977). Regulation, Economics and the Law. Lexington, MA and Toronto: Lexington Books D.C. Heath and Company – via Internet Archive.
- Other People's Property. Lexington, MA and Toronto: Lexington Books D.C. Heath and Company. 1976. ISBN 978-0669001877.
- Siegan, Bernard H., ed. (1977). The Interaction of Economics and the Law. Lexington, MA and Toronto: Lexington Books D.C. Heath and Company – via Internet Archive.
- Economic Liberties and the Constitution. Chicago, IL: The University of Chicago Press. 1980. ISBN 978-1412805254 – via Internet Archive.
- "The Rise and Fall of Economic Due Process: When the Supreme Court Championed and then Curtailed Economic Freedom" (1983, original paper, International Institute for Economic Research)
- The Supreme Court's Constitution: An Inquiry Into Judicial Review And Its Impact On Society. New Brunswick (USA) and Oxford (UK): Transaction Publishers. 1987. ISBN 978-0887386718 – via Internet Archive.
- Drafting a Constitution for a Nation or Republic Emerging into Freedom (1st ed.). Fairfax, Virginia: The Locke Institute. 1992 – via Internet Archive.
- Drafting a Constitution for a Nation or Republic Emerging into Freedom (2nd ed.). Fairfax, Virginia: George Mason University Press. 1994. ISBN 978-0-913969-70-0 – via Internet Archive. (based on his work as a consultant to the Bulgarian government on the creation of a new constitution) (ISBN 978-0896173019)
- Property and Freedom: The Constitution, the Courts, and Land-Use Regulation (Studies in Social Philosophy and Policy) (1997) (ISBN 978-1560009740)
- Property Rights: From Magna Carta to the 14th Amendment. New Brunswick (USA) and London (UK): Transaction Publishers. 2001. ISBN 978-0765807557 – via Internet Archive.

== See also ==
- Classical liberalism
- Constitutional economics
- Constitutional law
- Economic freedom
- Law and economics
- Libertarian theories of law
- Libertarianism
- Ronald Reagan judicial appointment controversies
- Zoning
