= Best Evidence (book) =

1980 book by David Lifton

- First edition cover
- Author: David Lifton
- Language: English
- Subject: JFK assassination
- Publisher: Macmillan
- Publication date: 1980
- Publication place: United States
- Media type: Print (hardcover, paperback)
- Pages: 747 p. (first trade edition, hardcover)
- ISBN: 978-0025718708
- OCLC: 7071895

Best Evidence: Disguise and Deception in the Assassination of John F. Kennedy is a 1980 book by David S. Lifton. It details the author's long quest to solve what he considered a fundamental mystery in the JFK assassination: why the president's gunshot wounds, as described on the afternoon of November 22, 1963 by doctors and nurses at Parkland Hospital in Dallas, differed sharply from the autopsy findings later that night at Bethesda Naval Hospital in Maryland. The Dallas medical staff who first examined JFK reported seeing evidence that he was shot from the front, whereas the Bethesda autopsy doctors concluded that all entrance wounds were in his back and the rear of his skull. The thesis put forth by Lifton to resolve this contradiction is that during the hours between Dallas and Bethesda, conspiracy participants secretly altered the president's body so that it would fit the government's assassination narrative, i.e., that he was killed by a lone gunman firing from behind.

Best Evidence was criticized in the mainstream press as "bizarre". It nevertheless rose to No. 4 on The New York Times nonfiction bestseller list in March 1981. Macmillan distributed 100,000 copies in hardback. There were seven paperback reprintings by Dell Publishing, totaling over 200,000 copies. In 1988, Carroll & Graf released an expanded second edition, including graphic autopsy photos that Lifton had recently obtained, which led to another surge in book sales.

== Background ==
In the mid-1960s, Lifton was pursuing a master's degree in engineering from UCLA when he dropped out of graduate school to focus his energies on researching the JFK assassination. For the next ten years, he collected notes, memos, and file material but had not yet converted his accumulated research into a book. In the summer of 1975, with encouragement from a friend, he began writing a manuscript that would become Best Evidence.

His work was rejected by over twenty publishers before Macmillan accepted it in 1978, giving the author a $10,000 advance. He continued to revise the manuscript, which delayed the hardcover publication date until the end of 1980 (he was still recording interviews with witnesses as late as October 1980). Due to the book's controversial contents, Macmillan went to unusual lengths in the fact-checking process. Best Evidence was "examined for potential factual errors by in-house counsel, an outside law firm, a forensic pathologist, and a neurosurgeon."

Lifton shepherded the book through all of its final pre-publication stages, and became "a fixture at Macmillan's New York offices". A Macmillan president joked that Lifton would probably still be making corrections at the bookstores.

== Description ==
Best Evidence is written as a first-person narrative of the author's 15-year search for the truth about the JFK assassination. More than simply another conspiracy theorist's view of what happened on November 22, 1963, the book recounts a personal quest to resolve factual conflicts in the record.

The central thesis of the book is that JFK's body was altered between the Dallas hospital where he was immediately taken after the shooting, and the Bethesda hospital where the autopsy was performed that evening. Lifton argues that the alteration was done for the purpose of creating erroneous conclusions about the number and direction of the shots. He details evidence—using both Warren Commission documents and his own research and interviews with those present at Dallas and Bethesda—of a marked change in the description of JFK's wounds. For instance, Dallas medical personnel and others who saw the deceased President said the fatal head wound indicated a bullet had entered the right temple and exited through a posterior skull cavity. The autopsy, on the contrary, showed a massive exit wound (about 4x the size of the reports of the Dallas staff) in the right front of the president's head, which would signify a shot originating from behind.

It was these sorts of discrepancies that drove Lifton's quest. The Warren Commission relied on what is normally considered a murder investigation's best evidence—the official autopsy report, X-rays and photos. In a chapter titled "Redefining the Problem: The Autopsy as 'Best Evidence'", Lifton recalls his interactions in 1966 with former Warren Commission counsel Wesley Liebeler. Lifton sat in on Liebeler's UCLA Law School lectures and had several one-on-one conversations with the attorney. Liebeler pointedly asked Lifton that if there were multiple assassins firing at JFK, as Lifton was alleging, where were the other bullets? Why were they not found during the autopsy?

Lifton describes his epiphany in late October 1966, which made him suspect that the "best evidence" had been compromised. He was studying a report by FBI agents James Sibert and Francis O'Neill, who attended the Bethesda proceedings and took notes on what they observed. They wrote that prior to the start of the autopsy, it was apparent there had been "surgery of the head area, namely, in the top of the skull." Since Lifton knew that no such surgery occurred at Parkland Hospital, this revelation by the two FBI agents intensified and focused his research, leading ultimately to his resolution of the contradictory Dallas/Bethesda evidence, i.e., that there was intentional fraud, or as Lifton puts it, a "medical forgery" to the body of the president:

I also realized that any pre-autopsy surgery to remove bullets held the answer to Liebeler's repeated taunt: If there's another assassin, then where's the bullet? If the President's body was tampered with prior to the autopsy, other bullets weren't found because they had been removed. I was amazed at the simplicity of the concept. Previously, I had no satisfactory answer why "other bullets" weren't found, other than to postulate a large conspiracy starting with the autopsy surgeons. Now I saw how many different officials and investigative agencies, ranging from the autopsy doctors to the FBI Laboratory, could be fooled. The secret removal of bullets before the body reached the autopsy room would have severed the ballistic connection between the shooting and the guns of other assassins—before the investigation began. The entire investigative apparatus of the U.S. government could have been misled.

To support his hypothesis, Lifton examines how, when and where the alteration could have taken place. Much of the book recounts his interviews with dozens of witnesses as he follows the complicated chain of custody of the president's body on November 22. He posits that after the assassination, unnamed conspirators on Air Force One—while the plane was en route from Dallas to Washington, D.C.—removed the body from its original bronze casket and placed it in a shipping casket. Once the plane landed at Andrews Air Force Base, the shipping casket was surreptitiously taken by helicopter from the side of Air Force One that was out of the TV camera's view. The casket was then transported to an unknown location – most likely Walter Reed Army Medical Center – where the body was surgically altered, and bullets were removed, to make it appear that JFK was shot only from the rear from a single gunman. The body was then transported to the Bethesda hospital before the autopsy began. Lifton writes: "The realization that the entire plan revolved around the secret alteration of the body changed my perspective as to what constituted a 'solution' to the Kennedy assassination. I was no longer interested in who put the bullets into the President's body, but who took them out."

Among the explicitly stated implications of Best Evidence are (1) the assassination was the work of a conspiracy, an "inside job" with, at minimum, a number of Secret Service men involved—the ones who controlled the crime scene and had access to the president's body—and (2) Lee Harvey Oswald was, as he claimed after his arrest, "a patsy".

In the course of his inquiry, Lifton discovers there was a "decoy ambulance" and "decoy helicopter" deployed that night, reportedly for security reasons, to disguise the transport of JFK from Andrews Air Force Base. The decoys were also said to have been a diversionary tactic to prevent crowds of reporters and onlookers from swarming First Lady Jacqueline Kennedy when she arrived with her husband's casket at the front of Bethesda Naval Hospital. But Lifton hypothesizes that the decoys were actually used by conspirators to temporarily sequester the body, perform surgical alterations, and then smuggle the casket back into Bethesda. He learns from witnesses that multiple caskets, supposedly containing JFK, showed up at different times that night at the hospital's morgue.

Even with his discovery of complex ambulance and casket movements and other previously unreported anomalies, the author acknowledges the impossibility of exactly chronicling the chain of custody of the president's body. Lifton did not have the power of subpoena of a formal investigation; he could only interview witnesses who would agree to speak to him. His goal in the book, as he explains it, is to raise a reasonable doubt:

When I began my chain-of-possession research, I was concerned that the anatomic evidence of body alterations would be ignored if I couldn't provide a plausible answer to the question: When and where? But I found it far easier to document that something out of the ordinary had happened than to establish the details of that event. Gradually my attitude changed. I realized that the details were less important than establishing that a significant interruption in the chain of possession of the body had occurred. Legally, that interruption was the basis for impeaching the body as evidence.

== Reception ==
Many mainstream press reviews characterized the book as the work of a fringe theorist. In The Washington Post, Robert Sherrill wrote, "If nothing else, Lifton can claim to have developed probably the grisliest and most bizarre of the countless Kennedy assassination cover-up plots." Reviewing the book for The New York Times, Harrison Salisbury wrote: "...no one before Mr. Lifton has constructed a theory so complicated, so quirky, in such violation of every law of common sense and reason." In New York magazine, Thomas Powers stated: "There are a lot of curious theories about what happened to John F. Kennedy on November 22, 1963, but none quite so bizarre as David Lifton's, a theory that makes all previous speculation about the president's murder... look like the work of dull and sober men." Powers' review was particularly critical of the publisher, insisting that "Lifton is not to blame for this travesty" whereas Macmillan owed an apology to everyone involved in the transport of Kennedy's body from Dallas to Washington.

Ed Magnuson of Time also labeled Lifton's theory "bizarre", but acknowledged the book was "meticulously researched", and added: "Preposterous? Absolutely. Yet there is virtually no factual claim in Lifton's book that is not supported by the public record or his own interviews, many of them with the lowly hospital and military bystanders whom official probes had overlooked."

Author and lawyer Gerald Posner described Best Evidence as "one of the most unusual conspiracy theories" that "relies on an elaborate shell game involving rapid exchanges of coffins, a decoy ambulance, and a switched body shroud. He contends that once the body (of President Kennedy) was stolen from Air Force One, a covert team of surgeons surgically altered the corpse before the autopsy later that day...purportedly...so the autopsy physicians would determine the bullets that hit the President were fired from the rear...thereby sealing the case against Oswald."

In a 1992 discussion of several JFK assassination conspiracy books, historian Stephen E. Ambrose wrote: "Mr. Lifton argues that the conspirators who killed Kennedy got possession of Kennedy's body somewhere between Dallas and Washington, then removed his brain and otherwise altered his body and wounds to support a single-gunman theory. Mr. Lifton's account of how this was done is almost impossible to follow, almost impossible to believe and almost impossible to refute."

In his 2007 book, Reclaiming History: The Assassination of President John F. Kennedy, Vincent Bugliosi devoted twelve pages to analyzing Lifton's theory. He prefaced his analysis by stating, "the theory is so unhinged that it really doesn't deserve one word in any serious treatment of the assassination", but that Bugliosi was "forced to devote some time to talking about nonsense of a most exquisite nature" due to the number of people who treated it seriously.

With the reissue of Best Evidence by Carroll & Graf Publishers in 1988, and by Signet Books in 1992, and with the book's continuing brisk sales, some critical perspectives changed. In 1990, Edwin McDowell of The New York Times called Lifton's work "one of the most durable" of the dozens of books about the JFK assassination. A 1988 Los Angeles Times profile of Lifton noted how "The Orlando Sentinel Star went so far as to compare the book in stature and import to William L. Shirer's The Rise and Fall of the Third Reich. Other reviewers characterized Best Evidence as 'meticulously detailed,' 'methodical and well-documented' and 'a challenge to the Warren Commission.'"

== Revised edition ==
In the revised, expanded 1988 edition published by Carroll & Graf, Lifton included a series of never-before-seen autopsy photographs of Kennedy at Bethesda. Lifton obtained the photos from a former Secret Service employee, who in turn had made copies, with permission, from the private collection of Secret Service Agent Roy Kellerman. Lifton also displayed the autopsy photos during an appearance on a 1988 PBS Nova episode, Who Shot President Kennedy?, which marked the first time they were shown on television. He asserted that the photos were consistent with his thesis of body alteration.
