= Warren Ferguson =

Warren Ferguson may refer to:

- Warren J. Ferguson (1920–2008), American federal judge
- Deputy Warren Ferguson, a fictional character on The Andy Griffith Show
