= Judge Bissell =

Judge Bissell may refer to:

- Jean Galloway Bissell (1936–1990), judge of the United States Court of Appeals for the Federal Circuit
- John Winslow Bissell (born 1940), judge of the United States District Court for the District of New Jersey

== See also ==
- Clark Bissell (1782–1857), associate justice of the Connecticut Supreme Court
