= Rachel Porter =

Rachel Porter may refer to:

- Rachel Porter, fictional character in Paycheck (film)
- Rachel Matheson née Porter, fictional character in the TV series Revolution
- Rachel Porter, fictional character in Fatal Deception: Mrs. Lee Harvey Oswald
