= David Lifton =

JFK assassination researcher and author (1939–2022)

David Samuel Lifton (September 20, 1939 – December 6, 2022) was an American author who wrote the 1980 bestseller Best Evidence: Disguise and Deception in the Assassination of John F. Kennedy, a work that puts forth evidence of a conspiracy to assassinate President Kennedy in Dallas, Texas on November 22, 1963.

== Biography ==
Lifton grew up in a Jewish family in Rockaway Beach, New York. He graduated from Cornell University's School of Engineering Physics in 1962, and then enrolled in UCLA to pursue an advanced degree in engineering. While there, he worked nights as a computer engineer for North American Aviation, a contractor for the Apollo program.

== Early JFK assassination interest ==
In autumn 1964, at roughly the time when the Warren Report was published, Lifton attended a lecture on the JFK assassination given by Warren Commission critic Mark Lane. Lifton's interest was piqued. He purchased the 26-volume set of Warren Commission Hearings and Exhibits, and started his own research on the case.

In May 1965, he became fascinated by a photograph he chanced upon in a Hollywood bookstore. He was flipping through a commemorative magazine, Four Dark Days in History, that included a reproduction of a Polaroid photo taken by Mary Moorman at the moment of the fatal JFK assassination shot. She was standing on the opposite side of the street from the grassy knoll in Dealey Plaza. Her photo was not part of the Warren Commission's published evidence: "Lifton was stunned to see, obscured in the shadows of the knoll, what he took to be a puff of smoke and the figure of a gunman in the act of shooting." He acquired a copy of the negative, had it enlarged, and shared it with assassination researchers Ray Marcus and Maggie Field. Although the enlarged photo's images were still murky, Marcus and Field agreed that Lifton had made an important discovery.

In October 1965, Lifton was one of the first to question the authenticity of the Zapruder film. He introduced himself to UCLA Law School Professor Wesley Liebeler, a former Warren Commission staff attorney. Lifton directed Liebeler's attention to a page from volume 18 of the Warren Commission Hearings and Exhibits, which printed copies of Zapruder frames. It was visible that a splice had been made in Zapruder frame 212 and that preceding frames were missing. In Lifton's words, the attorney studied the page intently and was "quite taken aback" since he did not know about the splice, and was concerned from a legal standpoint that a key piece of evidence had apparently been modified. Liebeler wrote a letter to Warren Commission General Counsel J. Lee Rankin, explaining the situation and asking if a formal request should be made to the FBI to investigate how the splice came to be there. In November, Liebeler showed Lifton the reply he had received from Rankin's special assistant Norman Redlich. It claimed that the missing frames "were of little value" because they captured a brief interval when the presidential limousine was hidden by a freeway sign.

In December 1965, ex-CIA Director and Warren Commission member Allen Dulles spoke at UCLA to a group of students, including Lifton who arrived at the event with two of the 26 volumes. In the Q&A section, Lifton tried to show Dulles evidence that:

the Zapruder film did not support the lone-gunman thesis. Dulles first grew angry, then condescending, and finally said that if there were going to be any more questions about the Warren Commission he'd just as soon go to bed.

Also in December 1965, Lifton was the first to report that Zapruder frames 314 and 315, as printed in volume 18 of the Warren Commission Hearings and Exhibits, were reversed; this made it unclear which direction JFK's head moved in reaction to the fatal shot. Lifton wanted to inform the FBI's photo expert Lyndal Shaneyfelt about the discrepancy, but was worried that doing so might jeopardize his own security clearance, required for his aerospace job at North American Aviation. And so Lifton drafted the letter to Shaneyfelt, but asked his girlfriend Judith Schmidt to sign and send it. To their great surprise, a few weeks later she received a signed letter from FBI Director J. Edgar Hoover stating that frames 314 and 315 had been swapped due to a "printing error", and that the error did not exist in the original Warren Commission exhibits.

In 1966, Lifton was dismissed from UCLA graduate school for neglecting his studies. He quit the aerospace job and began devoting all his time to the Kennedy assassination.

The January 1967 issue of Ramparts magazine presented a lengthy "special report" article, titled "The Case for Three Assassins", co-written by Lifton and David Welsh. The article laid out the scenario that more than one assassin was firing at Kennedy based on anomalies in the medical evidence.

In 1968, Lifton edited and wrote an introduction to the book, Document Addendum to the Warren Report, which anthologized three assassination-related documents that were not part of the Warren Commission's 26 volumes. Among them is the "Liebeler Memorandum", named after Warren Commission attorney Wesley Liebeler. It contains his "devil's advocate" criticisms after reviewing a draft of the Warren Report chapter on accused assassin Lee Harvey Oswald.

Lifton was credited as a researcher for the 1973 film Executive Action.

== Best Evidence ==
Lifton is most known for his 1980 book, Best Evidence: Disguise and Deception in the Assassination of John F. Kennedy. It chronicles the author's 15-year search for the truth about the JFK assassination. He describes his quest to resolve what he considered a troubling contradiction in the assassination record: the differing descriptions of President Kennedy's gunshot wounds, when comparing the accounts by Dallas medical personnel immediately after the shooting vs. the findings by autopsy doctors at Bethesda Naval Hospital later in the evening. Lifton's controversial conclusion was that JFK's body was surgically altered prior to the autopsy so that it would conform to the government's narrative of a lone gunman shooting from behind. The book identifies several breaks in the body's chain of custody on November 22, when the pre-autopsy surgery could have occurred.

Best Evidence was widely criticized in the mainstream press as "bizarre", but by March 1981 it rose to number 4 on The New York Times nonfiction bestseller list, and remained on the list for several months. In 1988, Lifton put out an expanded edition, which included graphic autopsy photos he had recently obtained, and it led to another period of robust sales.

== Later Life ==
In 1991 the 37-minute documentary film Best Evidence: The Research Video, produced and directed by Lifton, was released. The production presents the arguments in Lifton's book in documentary-form, with excerpts from his interviews of people connected with JFK's autopsy. In 1993, Lifton was portrayed by Robert Picardo in the television movie Fatal Deception: Mrs. Lee Harvey Oswald.

Lifton testified at the Assassination Records Review Board's "Review Board Experts' Conference" in May 1995 and on 17 September 1996 at a public hearing of the Board in Los Angeles. He also provided the Board with various materials including 35mm interpositives of the Zapruder film, alongside copies of audiotapes, videotapes, and transcripts of his witness interviews.

Lifton lived most of his adult life in West Los Angeles. As of 2010, he was working there full-time on a major volume about Oswald, tentatively titled Final Charade: Lee Oswald and the Assassination of President Kennedy.

Lifton was interviewed for the 2022 documentary The Assassination & Mrs. Paine about Ruth Paine.

== Death ==
David Lifton died on December 6, 2022, in hospice care in Las Vegas, Nevada, at age 83.

In a eulogy posted on the kennedysandking.com assassination website (successor to the ctka.net website that lobbied for declassification of all JFK files), researcher and author James DiEugenio commented on Lifton's unpublished manuscript:

At the time of his death, Lifton had been working for a very long time - decades actually - on a biography of Lee Harvey Oswald. That book was entitled Final Charade. This was to be part of a trilogy of Best Evidence, Final Charade and a volume on the Zapruder film. In the anthology The Great Zapruder Film Hoax, Lifton submitted an essay called "Pig on a Leash" about his theories of Z film alteration. We should all hope that the manuscript of Final Charade will eventually be published. Lifton spent so many years on it, so much money, and so much effort, that it needs to be printed. Only then can it be judged as part of the Lifton canon.
