= Executive Action (film) =

1973 political thriller film by David Miller

- Theatrical poster
- Directed by: David Miller
- Written by: Dalton Trumbo
- Story by: Donald Freed; Mark Lane
- Produced by: Edward Lewis
- Starring: Burt Lancaster; Robert Ryan; Will Geer
- Cinematography: Robert Steadman
- Edited by: George Grenville
- Music by: Randy Edelman
- Distributed by: National General Pictures
- Release date: November 7, 1973
- Running time: 91 minutes
- Country: United States
- Language: English
- Budget: under $1 million

Executive Action is an American political thriller film. It is a fictionalized account of a conspiracy to assassinate United States President John F. Kennedy. Released in November 1973 on the tenth anniversary of the JFK assassination, the film stars Burt Lancaster, Robert Ryan, and Will Geer. It was directed by David Miller, produced by Edward Lewis, and written by Dalton Trumbo. The screenplay was adapted from the novel Executive Action by Donald Freed and Mark Lane, published earlier in 1973; the novel also includes special material by Stephen Jaffe. Freed and Lane received film credits for their story, and Jaffe was the film's technical adviser and uncredited supervising producer.

Although Executive Action is about a conspiracy, it does not adhere to the conventions of the conspiracy thriller genre in which one or more independent journalists or outside investigators seek to expose the truth of a high-level conspiracy. Instead, the film is told from the standpoint of the conspirators, and the audience watches them carry out the JFK assassination in a methodical, businesslike manner.

== Plot ==
A narrator states that when asked years later about the JFK assassination and the Warren Commission report, former U.S. President Lyndon B. Johnson "expressed misgivings" that the commission's lone-gunman conclusion was correct. The narration ends by mentioning that the interview segment did not run on television, and it was cut from a program about Johnson at his own request.

At a June 1963 gathering in the palatial home of Robert Foster, shadowy figures from American industry, politics, and intelligence discuss their growing dissatisfaction with the Kennedy administration. Foster and the others try to persuade Harold Ferguson, a powerful oil magnate dressed in white, to back their plans for Kennedy's assassination. Foster's fellow conspirator James Farrington, a black-ops specialist, labels this an "executive action" (the intelligence term for assassinating a head of state). In a presentation to the assembled group, Farrington shows that magnicide is indeed a viable option. As examples, he cites the Lincoln, Garfield, and McKinley assassinations, along with a few failed attempts, such as against President Franklin Roosevelt in 1933. Farrington explains that these actions were carried out by alleged lone fanatics (later scenes show the grooming process unwittingly undergone by Lee Harvey Oswald to fulfill the lone-fanatic role in the JFK assassination). He adds that "the best chance for success would be to act during a motorcade, because they are always planned well in advance, allow for firing from three angles under cover and provide clean escapes during the following confusion."

Ferguson remains unconvinced, saying such schemes are "tolerable only if they're necessary, and permissible only if they work." Although obtaining Ferguson's approval is crucial to the conspirators, Farrington proceeds to organize shooting Teams A and B in anticipation that Ferguson will eventually change his mind. Team A is shown practicing in the Mojave Desert, firing at moving targets at medium-to-long range. One of the shooters says he can only guarantee the operation's success if he fires at a target travelling less than 15 miles per hour.

After a subsequent meeting, several of the conspirators discuss their paranoid fears about the future of the U.S. under the Kennedy brothers, and the imperiled security of ruling-class whites across the globe. Foster and Farrington seem privy to plans known to the CIA that Ferguson, a civilian, is perhaps unaware of. Foster forecasts the planet's population in a couple decades at seven billion, "most of them brown, yellow or black. All of them hungry.... They'll swarm out of their breeding grounds into Europe and North America." He regards victory in Vietnam as an opportunity to control the developing world and reduce its population to 550 million, ominously adding, "I know; I've seen the data." He continues that the techniques perfected overseas could then be used "to reduce our own excess population: blacks, Puerto Ricans, Mexican Americans, poverty-prone whites, and so forth."

Ferguson watches TV news and becomes increasingly agitated by Kennedy's liberal direction on civil rights, the Nuclear Test Ban Treaty, and nuclear disarmament. The decisive moment comes in an anti-Kennedy news report on the deteriorating situation in South Vietnam. It is followed by Kennedy's October 1963 decision (National Security Action Memorandum #263) to withdraw all U.S. advisers from Vietnam by the end of 1965, effectively ending America's combat involvement in the Vietnam War. Ferguson telephones Foster and tells him he now supports their executive action project. Foster and Farrington meet to share details about the final arrangements for the assassination. Once the business part of their conversation is complete, Foster musingly recites lines of King Richard's from Shakespeares's Richard II: "Nothing we can call our own but death / And that small model of the barren earth / Which serves as paste and cover to our bones. / For God’s sake, let us sit upon the ground / And tell sad stories of the death of kings."

The murder itself is described in a matter-of-fact way. As news of the successful assassination reaches the conspirators, the film depicts the aftermath. The shooters leave Dallas and the conspirators work to cover up the evidence. Farrington and his assistant Tim discuss the inconvenience of Oswald's survival. Tim approaches nightclub owner Jack Ruby, who stalks and kills Oswald. The plotters assess the political fallout in Washington, D.C. They're concerned about retribution from Attorney General Robert F. Kennedy and the believability of the Oswald-did-it story. Foster states that Bobby Kennedy is "not thinking as Attorney General tonight. He's grieving for a murdered brother. By the time his grief subsides, all the power will have passed." The conspirators agree that people will believe the official story because "they want to." Soon after, Foster receives a call from Farrington's assistant: Farrington has died of a heart attack at Parkland Hospital. The conspirators are now insulated from the link to the group that committed the JFK and Oswald killings.

The conspirators' work is not finished. A photo collage of 18 material witnesses is shown, all but two of whom, the film states, died of unnatural causes within three years of the JFK assassination. A voice-over says that an actuary of the British newspaper The Sunday Times calculated (mistakenly, as it turns out) the probability that all of these witnesses would die within that period of time to be one hundred thousand trillion to one. (Note: The number was given in a Sunday Times article on 26 February 1967. In response to a 1978 request by the House Select Committee on Assassinations for a copy of the actuarial study, the newspaper's legal representative replied that the article was based on a careless journalistic mistake and should not have been published. "This was realized by The Sunday Times editorial staff after the first edition — the one which goes to the United States and which I believe you have — had gone out, and later editions were amended. We asked the actuary the wrong question: what were the odds against fifteen named people out of the population of the United States dying within a short period of time [instead of] the odds against fifteen of those included in the Warren Commission index dying within a given period [would have been] much lower." Robert M. Musen, vice president and senior actuary at Metropolitan Life Insurance Company, estimated that the odds of 15 people out of 2,479 in the Warren Commission index dying within a three-year period, assuming a median age of 40, would be 98.16 percent, or one out of 1.2. Assuming a median age of 35, the number would be 57.09 percent, or one out of 1.75.)

== Cast ==
- Burt Lancaster as James Farrington
- Robert Ryan as Robert Foster
- Will Geer as Harold Ferguson
- John Anderson as Halliday
- Ed Lauter as Operations Chief - Team A
- President John F. Kennedy Archival Footage

== Production ==
The actor Donald Sutherland is credited with conceiving the idea for the film in 1972. He hired Mark Lane and Donald Freed to write the screenplay. Sutherland planned to act in and produce Executive Action, but he was compelled to abandon the project after failing to obtain studio financing, and ended up taking a role in another film. The project was then picked up by producer Edward Lewis. He brought in director David Miller and screenwriter Dalton Trumbo, who had previously teamed up on Lonely Are the Brave (1962). Most of the film's funding was supplied by Los Angeles businessman Herbert Magidson, who was known for his anti-Vietnam War activism.

The original Lane-Freed screenplay strongly implicated the CIA in the JFK assassination. In fact, the film's subtitle was "Conspiracy in America", with the first letters highlighted in red to spell out the Agency's initials. When he saw Trumbo's rewrite of their screenplay, Lane complained that the central hypothesis had been compromised: "He [Trumbo] didn't have the guts to stay with the position we took.... Ironically, the only organization cleared by the film is the CIA." In a 1991 retrospective article about Executive Action, Andy Marx wrote:

Once the film went into production, Lane and Freed tried to point out certain parts of Trumbo's script they disagreed with, but found themselves barred from the movie set. "We were thinking about what we could do to stop the film from being released," says Lane, "but we figured altogether it was probably better to have it come out and start people thinking about the assassination."

Executive Action was Robert Ryan's final film: he died of cancer four months before its release. Stephen Jaffe, an investigator who had worked with New Orleans District Attorney Jim Garrison during his investigation into the assassination, was the film's technical adviser, supervising producer, and also served as a press representative. He and Trumbo spent weeks consulting before Trumbo wrote the screenplay.

The film was shot under strict secrecy. Jaffe said there were rumors of CIA interest in the project, and one crew member reported a threat by the Agency to sabotage the production. As a rule, the locations were not disclosed, although it was known that Tulsa, Oklahoma was doubling for Dallas in a number of scenes. Freed commented on the unusual presence of security guards on the set.

Within a fictional context, the film intended to provide a "more logical" account of Kennedy's murder than the lone gunman theory put forth by the Warren Commission, set up by President Lyndon B. Johnson. As such, the film listed Warren Commission critics Penn Jones Jr. and David Lifton among its Technical Consultants. The purpose of Executive Action is made apparent by the following statement, which displays after the opening credits:

Although much of this film is fiction, much of it is also based on documented historical fact. Did the conspiracy we describe actually exist? We do not know. We merely suggest that it could have existed.

=== Music ===
The film's musical score was composed by Randy Edelman.

== Controversies ==
The day after Executive Action opened, The New York Times reported that National General Pictures had filed a $1.5 million lawsuit against NBC. The lawsuit alleged that the NBC-affiliated New York City station, WNBC-TV, breached an agreement with National General by cancelling a promotional commercial for Executive Action. The station objected to two particular images as "too violent": (1) the president in an open limousine being viewed through a telescopic gunsight, and (2) "a scene in which a marksman is shown firing practice shots at a target in the desert." Stations in Boston and Los Angeles also refused to air the promotional spots. Ira Teller, the director of advertising and publicity for National General, said after NBC turned down the commercial, "We went to the American Broadcasting Company and the Columbia Broadcasting System to seek available time, but were told that none was available." The lack of advertising, and limited theater distribution, contributed to an early disappearance of Executive Action. It wasn't seen on television until the late 1980s.

Executive Action was the first film to depict a conspiracy to assassinate John F. Kennedy. It has been contrasted with Oliver Stone's 1991 film JFK, which also posits a conspiracy. Although Executive Action was released near the tenth anniversary of the assassination, the film received little attention, and caused relatively little controversy compared to Stone's much more famous work. In a 1990s interview, Mark Lane suggested that the different reactions may have been partly due to the timing of Executive Action's release: "[I]t was too close to the assassination and people weren't ready to talk about it. It's been almost 30 years since the assassination and there's a whole new generation out there that really wants to know what went on."

== Critical reception ==
On the review aggregator Rotten Tomatoes, the film has a 60% rating with six of ten critic reviews being positive.

In The New Yorker, Pauline Kael called it "so graceless it's beyond using even as a demonstration of ineptitude.... It's a dodo bird of a movie, the winner of the Tora! Tora! Tora! prize—in miniature—for 1973, with matchlessly dull performances". Leonard Maltin declared the film a "bomb", dismissing it as an "Excruciatingly dull thriller [that] promised to clear the air about JFK's assassination but was more successful at clearing theaters."

In contrast, The New York Times gave it a positive review, with Nora Sayre writing that the film "offers a tactful, low-key blend of fact and invention. The film makers do not insist that they have solved John Kennedy's murder; instead, they simply evoke what might have happened...The film's sternest and strongest point is that only a crazed person acting on his own would have been acceptable to the American public — which, at that time, certainly did not want to believe in a conspiracy."

Meanwhile, Roger Ebert was ambivalent, giving the film two out of four stars and calling it "a dramatized rewrite of all those old assassination conspiracy books." Ebert stated, "There’s something exploitative and unseemly in the way this movie takes the real blood and anguish and fits it neatly into a semi-documentary thriller." He added that "Executive Action doesn't seem much to want to entertain" and labeled Miller's direction "colorless". Ebert said the film "borrows from actual newsreel footage of Kennedy, Oswald and Jack Ruby for most of its power. And it does have power, make no mistake. It has the power of evoking what will probably remain, for most of us, the most stunning public moment of our lives: the moment when we first learned that the President had been shot."

The film is parodied in season 10 episode 9 of The Simpsons, "Mayored to the Mob" (1998). The episode has Jim Leavelle training bodyguards by pretending to shoot their protectee from a grassy knoll on a cart.

== Home media ==
On 23 October 2007, Executive Action was released on DVD in the U.S. and Canada. The film is available on YouTube, Apple TV, Amazon Prime Video, Google Play Movie, and Fandango at Home.

== See also ==
- Assassination of John F. Kennedy in popular culture
- JFK (1991), an Oliver Stone film about the assassination of John F. Kennedy that also takes a conspiracy angle.
- Ruby (1992), a film centering around Jack Ruby that depicts a conspiracy to kill Kennedy.
- November 1963, a 2026 film that portrays a mafia plot to kill Kennedy.
- Fatal Deception: Mrs. Lee Harvey Oswald
- List of American films of 1973
