= Susan Liebeler =

American lawyer and businesswoman

- Born: Susan Levine; July 3, 1942 (age 84); New Castle, Pennsylvania, U.S.
- Education: University of Michigan; UCLA School of Law
- Occupations: Lawyer; businesswoman
- Spouse: Wesley Liebeler (died 2002)

Susan Wittenberg Liebeler (born July 3, 1942) is an American lawyer and businesswoman, a former official in the administration of President Ronald Reagan, and a former federal judicial nominee to the United States Court of Appeals for the Federal Circuit.

== Early life and education ==
Born Susan Levine in New Castle, Pennsylvania, Liebeler graduated from New Castle High School in New Castle in 1960. She earned a bachelor's degree from the University of Michigan in 1963 and a law degree from University of California, Los Angeles School of Law in 1966. She served as senior editor of the UCLA Law Review, and was named to the Order of the Coif.

== Professional career ==
Liebeler worked for two different law firms in Los Angeles from 1967 until 1970. She joined Republic Corp. in 1970 as a practicing attorney, leaving Republic in 1971. From 1972 until 1973, Liebeler was general counsel for Verit Industries. From 1973 until 1985, Liebeler was a professor of law at Loyola University in Los Angeles.

In 1984, Liebeler was designated by President Ronald Reagan as a commissioner at the United States International Trade Commission. In 1986, Reagan named Liebeler as the commission's chairman serving from 1986 to 1988.

From 1988 until 1994, Liebeler was a partner with the Los Angeles law firm Irell & Manella and also worked at LRN leaving in 1994.

Since 1995, Liebeler has been president of Lexpert Research Services, a company that she founded.

== Failed nomination to the Federal Circuit ==
On March 23, 1987, Reagan nominated Liebeler to be a judge on the United States Court of Appeals for the Federal Circuit to fill the vacancy created by the retirement of Shiro Kashiwa. Democrats in the Senate opposed Liebeler's nomination because of some decisions she had made while at the International Trade Commission.

On February 23, 1988, the Democratic-controlled U.S. Senate Judiciary Committee narrowly voted 7-6 not to report Liebeler's nomination favorably out of committee. However, the committee also voted 8–5 to report on her nomination without a recommendation. No vote ever was scheduled on her nomination, however, and her nomination was returned to Reagan on October 22, 1988. President George H. W. Bush declined to renominate Liebeler upon winning the presidency.

President George H.W. Bush eventually appointed S. Jay Plager to fill the seat to which Liebeler had been nominated.

== Personal ==
Liebeler's husband, retired UCLA law professor and onetime counsel to the Warren Commission Wesley Liebeler (also known as Jim Liebeler), was killed in a plane crash in Lake Winnipesaukee in Gilford, New Hampshire on September 25, 2002. Liebeler currently lives in Malibu, California.

== See also ==
- Ronald Reagan judicial appointment controversies
