= Stuart A. Summit =

American lawyer

Stuart A. Summit (born April 18, 1936) is an American lawyer, a New York City official, and a federal judicial nominee to the United States Court of Appeals for the Second Circuit whose nomination failed in 1988 due to unexpected opposition by a U.S. senator from his own party.

== Early life, education and professional career ==
Summit earned a bachelor's degree from Ohio State University in 1957 and a law degree from Ohio State in 1959. While in law school, he was elected to the Order of the Coif.

For 12 years, Summit helped two mayors of New York City select judicial appointees, and for another nine years he had screened candidates for the New York Supreme Court as part of his work for the State Commission on Judicial Nominations.

Summit was a partner with the New York City law firm Phillips Nizer LLP in the latter part of his career.

== Failed nomination to the Second Circuit ==
On September 23, 1987, toward the end of Ronald Reagan's presidency, Reagan nominated Summit to a seat on the United States Court of Appeals for the Second Circuit to replace Irving Kaufman, who had taken senior status.

Summit's name initially had been suggested by his former law partner, Arnold I. Burns, who had been a Deputy Attorney General at the time. And although the nomination of Summit, an active Republican, had not been thought to be particularly controversial, his nomination ultimately languished.

Initially, Summit's ethics were challenged by a personal injury attorney in New York who once had faced Summit in court. Then, Burns, who had been Summit's biggest champion in the Justice Department, resigned from the Reagan administration amid a public quarrel with Attorney General Edwin Meese. Even so, Summit was unanimously approved by the U.S. Senate Judiciary Committee on August 11, 1988, which should have placed his nomination on the fast track for confirmation.

However, shortly after judiciary committee approval of Summit's nomination, an unknown senator had placed an anonymous "hold" on Summit's nomination, which blocked it indefinitely. Ultimately, it became public that the "hold" had been placed by New York's Republican Sen. Alphonse D'Amato, who had actually introduced Summit to the U.S. Senate Judiciary Committee in April 1988. D'Amato's office never publicly explained the reason for its opposition to Summit's nomination. Summit told the Associated Press that he had made at least three telephone calls to D'Amato to find out if the report of D'Amato's opposition was true, but that the senator had never called him back. "If it is true, I'm amazed," Summit told the wire service. "I cannot imagine why." Summit also noted that D'Amato had even spoken at his confirmation hearings. "He very kindly attended the hearing in April of 1988 and spoke well of my credentials," Summit told the AP. The AP noted that the journals New York Law Journal and Manhattan Lawyer both had reported that D'Amato blocked Summit's nomination in retaliation for the U.S. Senate Judiciary Committee having poorly treated two candidates whom D'Amato had recommended for the United States District Court for the Eastern District of New York, New York Supreme Court Justices Robert Roberto Jr., who withdrew in June 1988 after the Judiciary Committee learned that he had engaged in a sex act with a 16-year-old prostitute while investigating a massage parlor in 1971, and Howard E. Levitt.

"That a single Senator, never mind one who introduced me to the committee, could simply stop the entire process only a few days before my confirmation without having to explain himself to anyone and without the courtesy of explaining himself to me, is simply beyond my understanding," Summit told the New York Times. "It's not in my makeup to be bitter. But no matter how exciting or thrilling my life now is, I will carry a sense of sadness with me. I had visualized myself dying in that job. I'll be grieving, probably all of my life."

After winning the 1988 election, President George H. W. Bush chose not to renominate Summit, and Bush instead selected for that Second Circuit seat his cousin, John M. Walker Jr., who was confirmed by the U.S. Senate in 1989.

== See also ==
- Ronald Reagan judicial appointment controversies
