= Guy G. Hurlbutt =

American lawyer

Guy Gordon Hurlbutt (born January 23, 1942) is an Idaho lawyer, who served as United States Attorney for the District of Idaho in the 1980s. Hurlbutt previously worked as Chief Deputy Attorney General of Idaho under then-Attorney General Wayne Kidwell. After leaving public office he entered private practice and later served in senior counsel and environmental-affairs roles at Boise Cascade Corporation. He was also a nominee to the United States Court of Appeals for the Ninth Circuit.

Toward the end of his career, Hurlbutt worked extensively in Idaho education, serving as President of Idaho Business for Education, teaching business law and ethics as an adjunct at Northwest Nazarene University, and helping to launch and lead the College of Western Idaho as a founding board member and long-time chairman, for which he earned statewide recognition.

== Early life and education ==
A native of Georgia, Hurlbutt earned a bachelor's degree in forestry in 1964 from the University of Georgia. He later earned a law degree from the University of South Carolina School of Law and a master's degree in environmental law from George Washington University. While in college and law school, Hurlbutt was employed as a US Forest Service Smokejumper, fighting wildfires and completing over 50 parachute jumps into the National Forests of the Western United States.

== Career ==
=== Legal career ===
Early in his career, Hurlbutt was a chief deputy attorney general under then-Idaho Attorney General Wayne Kidwell. Hurlbutt went into private legal practice in 1978.

On September 17, 1981, Hurlbutt was nominated by President Ronald Reagan to be a United States Attorney for the District of Idaho to replace M. Karl Shurtliff. Hurlbutt had been recommended by then-Sen. James A. McClure. After confirmation by the United States Senate, Hurlbutt served as a United States Attorney until 1984, when he took a job with Boise Cascade as its associate general counsel. Hurlbutt eventually was replaced as U.S. Attorney for Idaho by Maurice Owens Ellsworth.

=== Ninth Circuit nominee ===
On August 11, 1988, President Reagan nominated Hurlbutt to a seat on the United States Court of Appeals for the Ninth Circuit to replace Judge J. Blaine Anderson, who had died on April 16, 1988. However, since Hurlbutt's nomination came after July 1, 1988, the unofficial start date of the Thurmond Rule during a presidential election year, no hearings were scheduled on Hurlbutt's nomination, and the nomination was returned to Reagan at the end of his term. After President George H. W. Bush was elected, he chose not to renominate Hurlbutt for the post, selecting Thomas G. Nelson instead.

=== Later career ===
In 1997, Hurlbutt became Boise Cascade's director of environmental affairs, and he assumed responsibility for governmental affairs in 1998. Hurlbutt's final position with Boise Cascade was as vice president of public policy and environment. He retired from the company in 2004.

Following retirement from Boise Cascade, Hurlbutt became President of Idaho Business for Education, a non-profit entity committed to the statewide improvement of education in Idaho. In 2005, Hurlbutt joined the adjunct faculty of Northwest Nazarene University, teaching business law and business ethics, serving in that capacity until 2012.

In 2007, Hurlbutt was appointed by Idaho Governor C.L. "Butch" Otter to serve as a founding board member of the newly created College of Western Idaho, a community college. He became chairman of the board in December 2008, and was elected by popular vote to a four-year term in that year and again in 2012. He did not seek reelection when his term expired in 2016. The College of Western Idaho opened its doors in 2009 with an enrollment of 1000 students and under his tenure enrollment increased dramatically. By 2023, enrollment had increased to 21,759 credit students and 14,951 non-credit students. In 2012, Hurlbutt received the annual Pat Harwood award from the Idaho Association of Commerce and Industry for "distinguished service to and on behalf of Idaho Business." Hurlbutt has resided in Idaho since 1975, after moving there following his experiences working with the United States Forest Service as a smokejumper.
