= Consuelo Callahan =

American judge (born 1950)

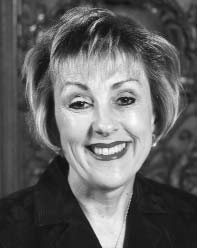

Judge of the United States Court of Appeals for the Ninth Circuit
- Incumbent
- Assumed office May 28, 2003
- Appointed by: George W. Bush
- Preceded by: Ferdinand Fernandez

Personal details
- Born: Consuelo María Callahan; 1950 (age 75–76) Palo Alto, California, U.S.
- Party: Republican
- Spouse: Randy Haight
- Education: Stanford University (BA); University of the Pacific (JD); University of Virginia (LLM)

Consuelo María Callahan (born 1950) is a United States circuit judge of the United States Court of Appeals for the Ninth Circuit.

== Background ==
Consuelo María Callahan was born in 1950, in Palo Alto, California. She was raised in Fremont, California and attended public schools in Fremont and in Los Altos, California. In 1972, she graduated from Stanford University with Bachelor of Arts degree, cum laude, in English. She graduated from McGeorge School of Law at the University of the Pacific, with a Juris Doctor in 1975. In 2004, she received a Master of Laws from the University of Virginia School of Law. She is married to Randy Haight.

A member of the Republican Party, Callahan began her law career as the Deputy City Attorney for Stockton, California, and then became Deputy District Attorney in San Joaquin County, California. She focused her practice on child abuse and sexual assault cases. In 1986, she became a commissioner of the Stockton Municipal Court. In 1992, she became the first Hispanic woman to be appointed to the San Joaquin County Superior Court. In 1996, Governor Pete Wilson appointed her to serve on the Third District California Court of Appeal in Sacramento.

=== Federal judicial service ===
On February 12, 2003, Callahan was nominated by President George W. Bush to serve on the United States Court of Appeals for the Ninth Circuit. Her Senate confirmation hearing was on May 7, 2003. On May 22, 2003, she was confirmed by a 99–0 vote. She received her judicial commission on May 28, 2003.

=== Supreme Court nomination speculation ===
On September 20, 2005, The New York Times named Callahan as a George W. Bush candidate for associate justice of the United States Supreme Court, to replace Associate Justice Sandra Day O'Connor. She was supported by some Democrats and the Congressional Hispanic Caucus as being more moderate than many of Bush's other appointees. On October 9, 2005 Chicago Sun-Times columnist Robert Novak reported Callahan was one of two finalists for the O'Connor seat, the other being White House Counsel Harriet Miers, whom Bush nominated. On October 27, 2005, Miers withdrew her name from consideration and again, Callahan was mentioned as a possible nominee. Bush ultimately nominated Samuel Alito to O'Connor's seat.

== Notable cases ==
On November 13, 2023, Callahan voted against temporarily blocking Idaho's abortion ban despite to its lack of exceptions for medical emergencies. A 7-4 majority voted to temporarily block the ban. On January 5, 2024, the Supreme Court said it would take up the case and dissolved the 9th circuit's temporary injunction.

== Awards and honors ==
On July 14, 2014, Callahan was presented the Ninth Circuit Professionalism Award from the American Inns of Court. The award presentation occurred at the Ninth Circuit Judicial Conference in Monterey, California, and was presented by Dean Deanell Reece Tacha of the Pepperdine University School of Law; Dean Tacha was a retired judge of the United States Court of Appeals for the Tenth Circuit and current President of the American Inns of Court Foundation.

== See also ==
- List of first women lawyers and judges in California
- List of Hispanic and Latino American jurists
- George W. Bush Supreme Court candidates

Legal offices
| Preceded by Ferdinand Francis Fernandez | Judge of the United States Court of Appeals for the Ninth Circuit; 2003–present | Incumbent |
