= John J. O'Brien (civil servant) =

American civil servant (1919–2001)

- In office November 29, 1963 – September 29, 1964

Personal details
- Born: John Joseph O'Brien; September 11, 1919 Somerville, Massachusetts
- Died: October 14, 2001 (aged 82) Johnston, Rhode Island
- Party: Democratic
- Spouse: Elinor O'Brien
- Children: John J. O'Brien Jr. Julie Tamuleviz; Joanne O'Brien; Jennifer O'Brien
- Education: Northeastern University (B.B.A); George Washington University (M.A)
- Occupation: Internal Revenue Service investigator

Military service
- Allegiance: United States of America
- Branch/service: United States Coast Guard
- Years of service: 1942-1946
- Unit: Bayfield-class attack transport
- Battles/wars: World War II

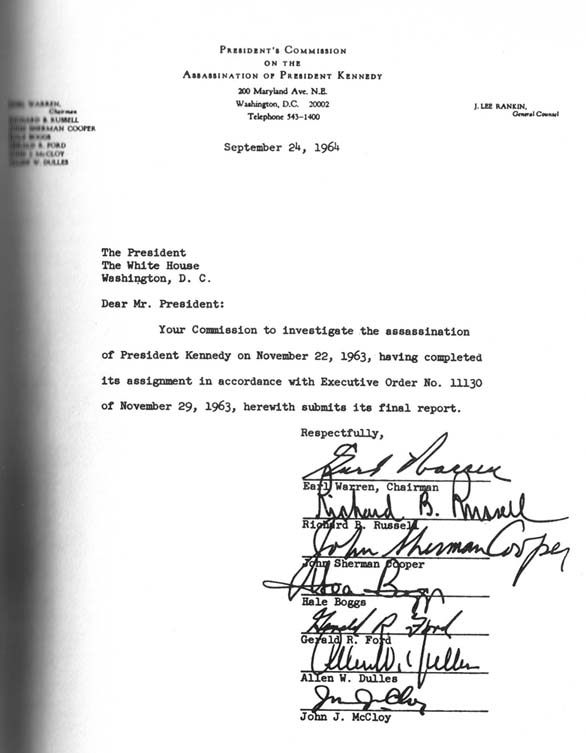
Final report cover

John Joseph O'Brien (September 11, 1919 – October 16, 2001) was an American civil servant who investigated the assassination of President John F. Kennedy.

Born in Somerville, Massachusetts, O'Brien received his B.B.A. degree in law and business, cum laude, from Northeastern University, Boston. He received his M.A. degree in the field of governmental administration from George Washington University, Washington, D.C., and in 1941 joined the Bureau of Internal Revenue. After service in the U.S. Coast Guard, O'Brien resumed his work as an Internal Revenue Service investigator. He was appointed as a staff member for the Warren Commission in 1963. Its purpose was to investigate the assassination of Kennedy.

After completion of the Warren Commission, he took the post of assistant chief of the Inspection Services Investigations Branch, in the National Office of Internal Revenue.
