= Judith Richards Hope =

American lawyer

Judith Richards Hope (born November 1940) is a lawyer, law professor, and corporate director. For a number of years, she served as Distinguished Visitor from Practice at Georgetown University Law Center. She is the president and CEO of a small international consulting firm, Hope & Company, P.C. She is the former daughter-in-law of Bob Hope.

== Early life and education ==
Daughter to an Ohio Methodist minister father and social-worker mother, Hope was born in Cincinnati, Ohio, and grew up in the small town of Defiance, Ohio, graduating from Defiance High School at the age of 16. She graduated magna cum laude/Durant Scholar, with Special Honors in Political Science from Wellesley College and received her law degree from Harvard University, where she was one of the fifteen female students and 550 males students to graduate in 1964. Hope wrote a book about her time at Harvard Law School called Pinstripes & Pearls: The Women of the Harvard Law Class of '64 Who Forged an Old Girl Network and Paved the Way for Future Generations. She received an honorary law doctorate from Harvard University in 2000.

== Professional career ==
Hope has taught law at Harvard Law School in addition to multiple adjunct appointments at Georgetown. She served as vice chair of the President's Commission on Organized Crime under President Ronald Reagan, her tenure spanning years in which federal prosecution of organized crime made some of its greatest strides in American history. In the administration of President Gerald Ford, Hope served as associate director of the White House Domestic Council. She was the first woman on Harvard University's governing board, the Harvard Corporation, where she served from 1989 to 2000 and chaired among other committees the Inspection (Audit) Committee and the Honorary Degree Committee.

Hope was a partner and senior advisor at Paul, Hastings, Janofsky, and Walker, for 24 years, serving as the first woman on that firm's (then) four-person governing Executive Committee. She is the chair emerita of the National Housing Partnership Foundation, and former director Director of the Altius Financial Corporation. She is a member of the National Council of the American Council of Trustees and Alumni. She has served in governing roles and as Chair of the Audit Committee of a number of Fortune 500 companies, including Union Pacific, General Mills and Russell Reynolds Associates.

== Judicial nomination ==
In April 1988, President Reagan nominated Hope to the United States Court of Appeals for the District of Columbia Circuit and, more specifically, to the seat vacated by Robert Bork and later filled by Clarence Thomas. Although not seen as controversial, Hope's nomination fell victim to election-year stalling by Senate Democrats, and her nomination expired without an up or down vote by the end of 1988, when Congress adjourned. Reagan's successor, President George H. W. Bush, did not renew the nomination, and possibly, the New York Times speculated, as Hope served as General Counsel to Bush's primaries opponent in 1988, Kansas Sen. Bob Dole. Bush ultimately tapped Clarence Thomas for the seat.

== See also ==
- Ronald Reagan judicial appointment controversies
