= Melvin A. Eisenberg =

American legal academic

- Born: December 3, 1934 (age 91)

Academic background
- Education: Columbia University (BA); Harvard University (LLB)

Academic work
- Discipline: Corporate Law
- Institutions: UC Berkeley School of Law

Melvin A. Eisenberg (born 3 December 1934) is the Jesse H. Choper Professor of law at the University of California, Berkeley. After studying at Columbia University (1956) and Harvard University (1959), he worked in the firm Kaye Scholer Fierman Hays & Handler, as assistant counsel in the Warren Commission, and joined Berkeley in 1966. He is recognised as a leading scholar in US corporate law, and contract law, in both of which he has authored leading textbooks.

He has advised the American Law Institute on both the Restatement (Third) of Agency and Restatement (Third) of Restitution. From 1991 to 1993, he held the Justice R. Ammi Cutter Chair at the institute. He was also Justin W. D'Atri Professor of Law, Business, and Society at Columbia University.

Eisenbeg received a Guggenheim Fellowship in 1981. He is also a fellow of the American Academy of Arts and Sciences, elected in 1984.

== Publications ==
Books

- Basic Contract Law (8th edn 2006)
- Cases and Materials on Corporations & Other Business Organizations (9th edn)

Articles

- 'The Structure of Corporation Law' (1989) 89(7) Columbia Law Review 1461, arguing for a core of mandatory rules in corporate law
- ‘Legal Modes of Management Structure in the Modern Corporation: Officers, Directors, and Accountants’ (1975) 63 California Law Review 376
- ‘Access to the Corporate Proxy Machinery’ (1970) 83 Harvard Law Review 1489, argued that shareholders should have rights to initiate actions like a sale or merger or amending the certificate of incorporation without a prior board proposal.
