= Sherman Unger =

American lawyer

Sherman Edward Unger (October 9, 1927 – December 3, 1983) was a former official in the administrations of Presidents Richard Nixon and Ronald Reagan, with his final role being the top lawyer for the United States Department of Commerce. Unger also was a federal judicial nominee to the United States Court of Appeals for the Federal Circuit at the time of his death.

== Early life and education ==
Born in Chicago, Unger earned a bachelor's degree in 1950 from Miami University in Ohio and a law degree in 1953 from the University of Cincinnati College of Law.

== Professional career ==
Unger began his career in the United States Air Force as a judge advocate, from 1953 until 1956. He then worked in private legal practice in Cincinnati as an associate and then as a partner for the firm of Frost & Jacobs from 1956 until 1969, when he became the general counsel of the United States Department of Housing and Urban Development. Unger served in that role until 1970. Unger worked as a vice president of Cincinnati-based American Financial Corp. from 1971 until 1972. From 1972 until 1981, Unger practiced law in Cincinnati and Washington, D.C.

In 1981, Reagan appointed Unger to be general counsel for the United States Department of Commerce.

== Failed nomination to the Federal Circuit ==
On December 15, 1982, Reagan nominated Unger to a newly created seat on the United States Court of Appeals for the Federal Circuit. While the nomination died at the end of the 97th Congress, Reagan renominated Unger to the same Federal Circuit seat on April 21, 1983. Upon both times Unger was nominated to the Federal Circuit, the American Bar Association gave him a unanimous rating of "not qualified." The ABA's committee members who had investigated Unger, including former Secretary of Transportation William Thaddeus Coleman, Jr. and committee chair and future Commodity Futures Trading Commission chief Brooksley Born, had testified that he was not qualified "because he lacked the personal integrity and judicial temperament required of a federal judge." However, many supporters vouched for Unger's personal integrity, including Democrats from the Carter administration like former White House counsel Lloyd Cutler and former United States Attorney General Griffin Bell.

While the United States Senate Judiciary Committee held a hearing on Unger's nomination on September 30, 1983, it took no action on Unger's nomination because he was diagnosed with terminal cancer. Unger died on December 3, 1983.

Unger wound up being the only Reagan administration judicial nominee to earn a unanimous rating of "not qualified" from the ABA.

For more than 20 years after Unger's nomination, no other federal judicial nominee earned a unanimous "not qualified" rating from the ABA. Michael Wallace, a failed nominee of President George W. Bush to the United States Court of Appeals for the Fifth Circuit, was the next nominee to earn such a rating.

== See also ==
- Ronald Reagan judicial appointment controversies
