= Wesley Liebeler =

American law professor (1931–2002)

- Born: Wesley James Liebeler; May 9, 1931; Langdon, North Dakota, U.S.
- Died: September 25, 2002 (aged 71); Lake Winnipesaukee, New Hampshire, U.S.
- Education: Macalester College (BA); University of Chicago Law School (JD)
- Occupation: Law professor
- Spouse: Susan Liebeler

Wesley James "Jim" Liebeler (May 9, 1931 – September 25, 2002) was an American law professor at the University of California, Los Angeles (UCLA) and later at George Mason University. In 1964 he was one of the staff attorneys on the Warren Commission's inquiry into the assassination of President John F. Kennedy.

Liebeler was born in Langdon, North Dakota. He received a BA in 1953 from Macalester College and a JD in 1957 from the University of Chicago Law School. He was a member of the Order of the Coif and served on the University of Chicago Law Review editorial board. After graduating, he practiced law on Wall Street for the firm of Carter, Ledyard & Milburn, where he primarily worked on corporate litigation cases.

When Warren Commission attorneys were being hired, Liebeler was recommended to Assistant Counsel Howard Willens by the dean of the University of Chicago Law School, and was assigned to research the background of accused assassin Lee Harvey Oswald. A few weeks before the Commission released its summary findings in the Warren Report, Liebeler wrote a twenty-six page internal memo that included his detailed comments after reviewing galley proofs of Chapter 4 of the Report (the chapter was titled "The Assassin"). He essentially played the role of devil's advocate to identify what he viewed as weaknesses in the Commission's case against Oswald. This memo, later known as the "Liebeler Memorandum", was first published by David Lifton in a 1968 small-press book, Document Addendum to the Warren Report.

When Liebeler testified in 1977 before the House Select Committee on Assassinations (HSCA), he was asked about his memorandum and the concerns he had raised. He replied that they involved "problems ranging from matters of form and location of footnotes" to his feeling that the chapter "was overwritten in the sense that it made statements that could not really be supported by the nature of the underlying evidence." He said he worked with General Counsel J. Lee Rankin and other Commission attorneys to incorporate some of his suggested changes to Chapter 4 before the Report was made public.

In 1965 Liebeler joined UCLA Law School, where he taught antitrust law for more than 30 years, eventually attaining the title of professor-emeritus. He took a leave from UCLA in 1975-76 to serve as director of the Office of Policy Planning and Evaluation within the Federal Trade Commission (FTC). He was successful in urging the FTC to challenge anticompetitive restraints enforced by state boards and commissions. In 1999 he joined George Mason's School of Law and taught courses in antitrust and constitutional political economy.

On September 25, 2002, Liebeler was killed along with his flight instructor when their Piper Twin Comanche crashed into New Hampshire's Lake Winnipesaukee. The National Transportation Safety Board summarized the probable cause of the accident: "The flight instructor's failure to maintain airplane control, which resulted in an uncontrolled collision with water."

Liebeler was survived by his wife Susan and their daughter and two sons.
