= Fatal Deception: Mrs. Lee Harvey Oswald =

1993 television film directed by Robert Dornhelm

- Genre: Biography; Drama
- Written by: Steve Bello
- Directed by: Robert Dornhelm
- Starring: Helena Bonham Carter; Robert Picardo; Frank Whaley
- Composer: Harald Kloser
- Country of origin: United States
- Original language: English

Production
- Executive producers: David L. Wolper; Bernard Sofronski
- Producer: Paul Pompian
- Production locations: United States; Russia
- Cinematography: Yuri Neyman
- Editor: Gerry Hambling
- Running time: 88 minutes
- Production companies: Elliot Friedgen & Company

Original release
- Network: NBC
- Release: November 15, 1993

Fatal Deception: Mrs. Lee Harvey Oswald is a 1993 American biographical drama television film directed by Robert Dornhelm and starring Helena Bonham Carter, Robert Picardo, and Frank Whaley. It tells the story of Marina Oswald (played by Bonham Carter), the widow of Kennedy's assassin Lee Harvey Oswald (played by Whaley).

The film marked the 30th anniversary of the assassination of John F. Kennedy, which occurred on November 22, 1963. Bonham Carter earned her first Golden Globe Award nomination for her performance. Whaley had previously played an imposter of Lee Harvey Oswald in Oliver Stone's JFK (1991).

== Plot ==
The story focuses on Marina Oswald (Helena Bonham Carter), the wife of Lee Harvey Oswald. Barely able to speak English, she is thrust into questioning by David Lifton (Robert Picardo). It portrays deep sadness, and explores the story of a woman ending up alone in a foreign country, subjected to considerable shunning, even after her remarriage.

The story is based on the widow of Lee Harvey Oswald, the assassin of President Kennedy. Via flashbacks, the story traces the woman's life from her days in the Soviet Union, the turmoil following the assassination, raising her family, and coming to grips with the fact that, she too, may have been a pawn in a grand conspiracy.

== Cast ==
- Helena Bonham Carter as Marina Oswald
- Robert Picardo as David Lifton
- Frank Whaley as Lee Harvey Oswald
- Bill Bolender as George de Mohrenschildt
- Brandon Smith as Kenneth Porter
- Lisa Renee Wilson as Rachel Porter
- Deborah Dawn Slaboda as Julie Porter
- Ingeborga Dapkūnaitė as Lubya
- Vladimir Ilyin as Uncle
- Quenby Bakke as Janet Williams
- Norman Bennett as Funeral Director
- Rodger Boyce as 2nd Agent
- Cliff Stephens as 1st Agent
- Alan Ackles as TV Host
- Randall Bonifay as 2nd FBI Guard
- Darryl Cox as 1st FBI Guard

== Production ==
The film was the idea of its producer, Bernard Sofronski, who got the idea in 1988 when he saw a newspaper article featuring a picture of Marina Oswald hanging up her children's laundry on a clothesline. Sofronski began research and then had conversations with Marina and her two daughters. Filming took place in Dallas and Moscow.

== Reviews ==
In a review for the Los Angeles Times, Howard Rosenberg wrote: "“Fatal Deception” appears to say nothing that hasn't already been said ad infinitum during the nation's nonstop dialogue concerning Kennedy and his assassination. All in all, it seems like just another bump on a very long log." Drew Voros of Variety called it "a slow-mover for a topic that has been covered over and over again". John J. O'Connor for The New York Times praises Bonham and Whaley's "chillingly persuasive performances", but adds that the film gets "caught, it might be added, between speculations that can neither be proved nor disproved".

== Awards and nominations ==
Year	Award	Category	Nominee	Result	Ref.
1994	51st Golden Globe Awards	Best Actress – Miniseries or Television Film	Helena Bonham Carter	Nominated	

== See also ==
- Assassination of John F. Kennedy in popular culture
- Executive Action, a 1973 film that presents the assassination of John F. Kennedy from a conspiracy point of view.
- Ruby, a 1992 film centering around Jack Ruby that depicts a conspiracy to kill Kennedy.
- November 1963, a 2026 film that portrays a mafia plot to kill Kennedy.
