= Jean Galloway Bissell =

American judge

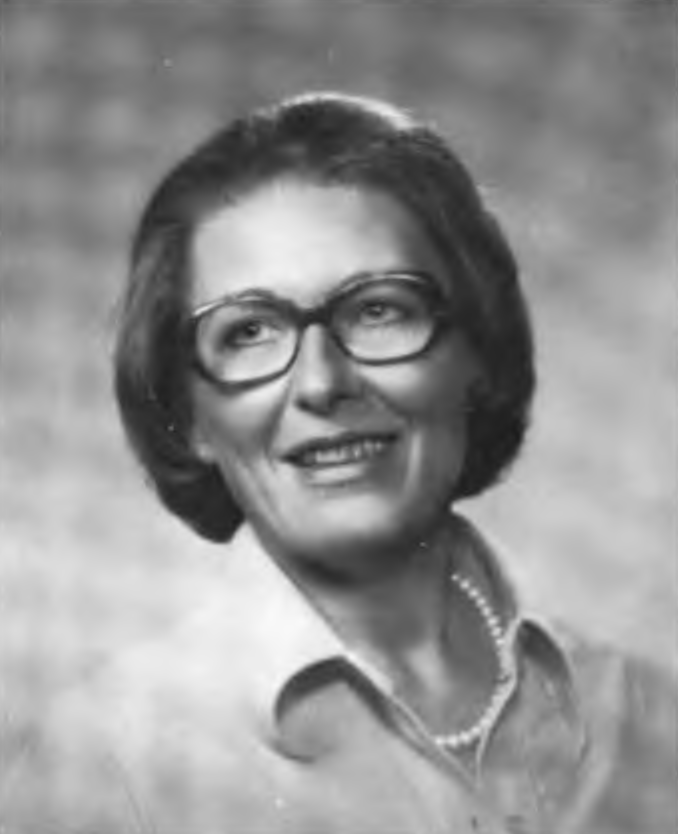

Judge of the United States Court of Appeals for the Federal Circuit
- In office June 11, 1984 – February 4, 1990
- Appointed by: Ronald Reagan
- Preceded by: Robert Lowe Kunzig
- Succeeded by: Randall Ray Rader

Personal details
- Born: Jean Galloway; June 9, 1936 Due West, South Carolina, U.S.
- Died: February 4, 1990 (aged 53) Washington, D.C., U.S.
- Education: University of South Carolina (BS); University of South Carolina School of Law (LLB)

Jean Galloway Bissell (June 9, 1936 – February 4, 1990) was a South Carolina attorney who became a high-ranking bank executive, and later a United States circuit judge of the United States Court of Appeals for the Federal Circuit.

== Early life and education ==
Born in Due West, South Carolina, Bissell earned a Bachelor of Science degree from the University of South Carolina in 1956 and a Bachelor of Laws from the University of South Carolina School of Law in 1958.

== Professional career ==
Bissell worked in private legal practice in Greenville, South Carolina from 1958 until 1971 and then in Columbia, South Carolina until 1976. She worked as an executive at South Carolina National Bank in Columbia from 1976 until 1984, rising to become the highest-ranking female executive among the 100 largest bank holding companies in the United States. Bissell also lectured at the University of South Carolina in the 1970s and early 1980s.

== Federal judicial service ==
On May 24, 1984, Bissell was nominated by President Ronald Reagan to a new seat established by 96 Stat. 25 on the United States Court of Appeals for the Federal Circuit. Reagan previously had nominated United States Department of Commerce official Sherman Unger to the seat in 1982, but Unger's nomination drew significant opposition and never was voted upon because Unger became afflicted with terminal cancer and died in late 1983. Bissell was confirmed by the United States Senate on June 8, 1984, and received her commission on June 11, 1984. With her confirmation, she became the first female South Carolina lawyer to become a federal judge. She served on the court until her death.

== Death ==
Bissell died of cancer on February 4, 1990, at Sibley Memorial Hospital in Washington, D.C., at the age of 53.

== Sources ==
Legal offices
Preceded by Robert Lowe Kunzig	Judge of the United States Court of Appeals for the Federal Circuit; 1984–1990	Succeeded by Randall Ray Rader
