= Warren J. Ferguson =

American judge (1920–2008)

Senior Judge of the United States Court of Appeals for the Ninth Circuit
- In office July 31, 1986 – June 25, 2008

Judge of the United States Court of Appeals for the Ninth Circuit
- In office November 27, 1979 – July 31, 1986
- Appointed by: Jimmy Carter
- Preceded by: Seat established by 92 Stat. 1629
- Succeeded by: Ferdinand Fernandez

Judge of the United States District Court for the Central District of California
- In office November 3, 1966 – December 20, 1979
- Appointed by: Lyndon B. Johnson
- Preceded by: Seat established by 80 Stat. 75
- Succeeded by: A. Wallace Tashima

Personal details
- Born: Warren John Ferguson; October 31, 1920 Eureka, Nevada, U.S.
- Died: June 25, 2008 (aged 87) Fullerton, California, U.S.
- Education: University of Nevada, Reno (BA); USC Gould School of Law (JD)

Warren John Ferguson (October 31, 1920 – June 25, 2008) was an American jurist who served as a United States circuit judge of the United States Court of Appeals for the Ninth Circuit.

== Education and career ==
Ferguson was born in Eureka, Nevada and earned a Bachelor of Arts degree at the University of Nevada, Reno in 1942. He served in the United States Army during World War II. Upon return, he earned his Juris Doctor from USC Gould School of Law in 1949. He was in private practice in Fullerton, California from 1949 to 1959. In 1959 he was appointed judge of the Anaheim-Fullerton Municipal Court where he served until 1961. He was a Superior Court judge in Santa Ana, California from 1961 to 1966.

== Federal judicial service ==
Ferguson was nominated by President Lyndon B. Johnson on September 26, 1966, to the United States District Court for the Central District of California, to a new seat authorized by 80 Stat. 75. He was confirmed by the United States Senate on October 20, 1966, and received his commission on November 3, 1966. His service terminated on December 20, 1979, due to elevation to the Ninth Circuit.

Ferguson was nominated by President Jimmy Carter on September 28, 1979, to the United States Court of Appeals for the Ninth Circuit, to a new seat authorized by 92 Stat. 1629. He was confirmed by the Senate on November 26, 1979, and received his commission on November 27, 1979. He assumed senior status on July 31, 1986. His service terminated on June 25, 2008, due to his death at his home in Fullerton, California.

== Notable cases ==
Notable cases include a 1971 decision after Spencer Haywood was denied a transfer from the American Basketball Association's Denver Rockets to National Basketball Association's Seattle SuperSonics. The NBA at the time prohibited college graduates to play for four years after graduation; the ABA did not. The antitrust suit went to the Supreme Court (Haywood v. National Basketball Association), which affirmed the decision.

His ruling in Sony Corp. of America v. Universal City Studios, Inc. in 1979 ushered in the era of home video recording by allowing Sony to market the Betamax.

Legal offices
Preceded by Seat established by 80 Stat. 75	Judge of the United States District Court for the Central District of California; 1966–1979	Succeeded by A. Wallace Tashima
Preceded by Seat established by 92 Stat. 1629	Judge of the United States Court of Appeals for the Ninth Circuit; 1979–2008	Succeeded by Ferdinand Fernandez
