= Ferdinand Fernandez =

American judge (born 1937)

Senior Judge of the United States Court of Appeals for the Ninth Circuit
- Incumbent
- Assumed office June 1, 2002

Judge of the United States Court of Appeals for the Ninth Circuit
- In office May 22, 1989 – June 1, 2002
- Appointed by: George H. W. Bush
- Preceded by: Warren J. Ferguson
- Succeeded by: Consuelo Callahan

Judge of the United States District Court for the Central District of California
- In office October 17, 1985 – May 24, 1989
- Appointed by: Ronald Reagan
- Preceded by: Seat established
- Succeeded by: Gary L. Taylor

Personal details
- Born: Ferdinand Francis Fernandez; May 29, 1937 (age 89) Pasadena, California, U.S.
- Spouse: Priscilla McMillen
- Education: University of Southern California (BS, JD); Harvard University (LLM)

Ferdinand Francis Fernandez (born May 29, 1937) is a Senior United States circuit judge of the United States Court of Appeals for the Ninth Circuit and a former United States District Judge of the United States District Court for the Central District of California.

== Education and career ==
Born in Pasadena, California, Fernandez received a Bachelor of Science degree from the University of Southern California in 1958, a Juris Doctor from the University of Southern California Gould School of Law in 1962, and a Master of Laws from Harvard Law School in 1963. He was a law clerk for Judge William M. Byrne of the United States District Court for the Central District of California from 1963 to 1964, thereafter entering private practice in Pomona, California until 1980. He was a judge of the San Bernardino County State Superior Court of California from 1980 to 1985.

== Federal judicial service ==
On July 19, 1985, Fernandez was nominated by President Ronald Reagan to a new seat on the United States District Court for the Central District of California created by 98 Stat. 333. He was confirmed by the United States Senate on October 16, 1985, and received his commission on October 17, 1985. His service terminated on May 24, 1989, due to elevation to the court of appeals.

Fernandez was nominated by President George H. W. Bush on February 28, 1989, for elevation to a seat on the United States Court of Appeals for the Ninth Circuit vacated by Judge Warren John Ferguson. Fernandez was confirmed by the United States Senate on May 18, 1989, and received his commission on May 22, 1989. He assumed senior status on June 1, 2002.

== Notable cases ==
On February 28, 2020, Fernandez dissented when the 9th circuit ruled 2-1 that Trump's administration could not force asylum applicants to wait in Mexico while their court proceedings went on. On March 11, 2020, the Supreme Court agreed with Fernandez and permitted Trump's "Remain-in-Mexico" policy to continue.

On April 7, 2020, Fernandez dissented when the 9th circuit ruled 2–1, in an opinion by Milan Smith, that immigrants that have been detained for 6 months or more must be given bond hearings. Fernandez argued that the mode of analysis the majority used was plainly wrong.

== See also ==
- List of Hispanic and Latino American jurists

== Sources ==
Legal offices
New seat	Judge of the United States District Court for the Central District of California; 1985–1989	Succeeded by Gary L. Taylor
Preceded by Warren J. Ferguson	Judge of the United States Court of Appeals for the Ninth Circuit; 1989–2002	Succeeded by Consuelo Callahan
