= Thurmond rule =

Controversial US Senate majority-party strategem to stop judicial approval votes

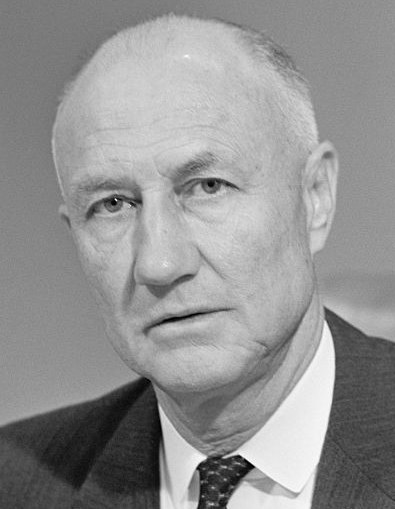
The Thurmond rule was first posited by Senator Strom Thurmond in 1968.

The Thurmond rule in U.S. politics posits that, at some point in a U.S. presidential election year, the U.S. Senate should not confirm the president's nominees to the federal judiciary, except under certain circumstances. The rule is most applicable when the President and Senate majority are of opposite political ideologies, and the Judiciary Committee can prevent a floor vote on a nominee in the hope that their party's presidential candidate will win the election and be able to nominate more favorable candidates.

The practice is not an actual rule. It has not always been followed in the past, with Presidents continuing to appoint and the Senate continuing to confirm judicial nominees during election years, but it is intermittently invoked by senators from both political parties, usually when it is politically advantageous to do so.

== Description ==
The Thurmond rule "has its origins in June 1968, when Senator Strom Thurmond, Republican of South Carolina, blocked President Lyndon B. Johnson's appointment of Justice Abe Fortas as chief justice." The "rule" has been variously described:

- A 2008 Congressional Research Service report described "a practice referred to by some as the 'Thurmond rule':
  at some point in a presidential election year, the Judiciary Committee and the Senate no longer act on judicial nominations — with exceptions sometimes made for nominees who have bipartisan support from Senate committee and party leaders.
- The New York Times reported in 2016 that the rule "is not an actual rule, which means there is no way to adjudicate how close to an election it applies, or whether it applies at all."
- Al Kamen of The Washington Post, in 2012, wrote:
  The 'rule,' which apparently dates to 1980, posits that, sometime after spring in a presidential election year, no judges will be confirmed without the consent of the Republican and Democratic leaders and the judiciary chairman and ranking minority member.
- CBS News, in 2007, described "an informal understanding... that only consensus nominees, if that, would be considered in the latter part of a presidential election year."
- The American Constitution Society refers to the "rule" as an "urban legend of judicial nominations" that "never became a 'rule' at all, and as such, it can be disregarded for good reason–it is the Thurmond Myth."
- The Alliance for Justice has written: "The Thurmond Rule is not real. It is a myth, a figment of the partisan imagination invoked to give an air of legitimacy to a strategy—blocking even the most noncontroversial of judicial nominees—that is pure obstruction. Most obviously, there is no Thurmond Rule in the formal sense—no law, senate rule, or bipartisan agreement renewed each congress. Its existence also is belied by historical practice."
- American Bar Association President Wm. T. (Bill) Robinson III, in a 2012 letter sent to Senate leadership of both parties, wrote: "As you know, the 'Thurmond Rule' is neither a rule nor a clearly defined event." Robinson wrote that while "the ABA takes no position on what invocation of the 'Thurmond Rule' actually means or whether it represents wise policy," the practice is not a precedent, given the fact "that there has been no consistently observed date at which this has occurred during the presidential election years from 1980 to 2008."

== Nonapplication ==
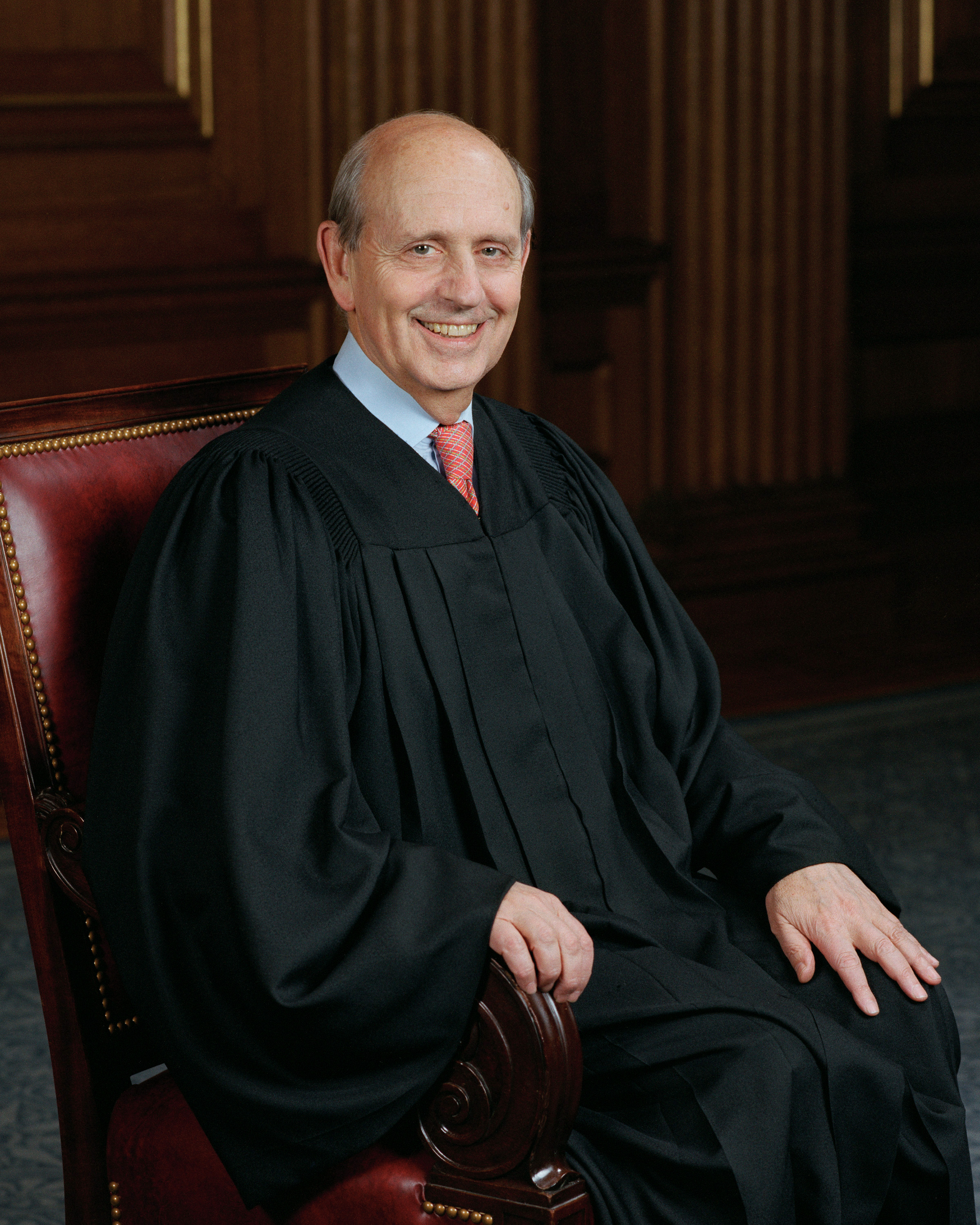
Stephen Breyer was appointed by President Jimmy Carter to the First Circuit Court of Appeals on November 13, 1980, and confirmed by the Senate on December 9, 1980, both during Carter's lame duck period. Breyer was later elevated to the Supreme Court.

The "rule" is not observed consistently by the Senate. A 2012 study by judicial expert Russell Wheeler of the Brookings Institution showed that in each of the four previous presidential election years (1996, 2000, 2004, and 2008), the pace of federal judicial nominations and confirmations slowed but did not stop. Wheeler describes the "rule" as a myth, noting that while it becomes more difficult for a president to push through his nominees in his last year of office, nominations and confirmations have been routinely made in presidential election years.

Similarly, a 2008 Congressional Research Service report could not identify any "consistently observed date or point in time after which the Senate ceased processing district and circuit nominations during the presidential election years from 1980 to 2004." For instance, in December 1980, Stephen Breyer (who later became an Associate Justice of the Supreme Court of the United States) was confirmed as a judge of the United States Court of Appeals for the First Circuit. Additionally, in 1984, when Thurmond was chair of the Senate Judiciary Committee, judicial confirmations occurred that fall.

Politifact has rated Marco Rubio's claim that "there comes a point in the last year of the president, especially in their second term, where [the president] stop[s] nominating" both Supreme Court justices and Court of Appeals judges as "false."

== Political invocation ==
Sarah A. Binder, a senior fellow at the Brookings Institution, notes that although studies have shown "that there is no such formal 'rule,'" that "hasn't stopped senators from either party from talking about the practice as a rule or often even as a doctrine. Because both parties have, over time, valued their ability to block the president's judicial nominees, keeping alive the Thurmond Rule has proved convenient for both parties at different times." Glenn Kessler and Aaron Blake of The Washington Post note that senators of both political parties—such as Mitch McConnell and Pat Leahy—frequently flip-flop on the issue of judicial nominations in presidential election years, alternately invoking the Thurmond Rule and denying its validity, depending on which party controls the Senate and the White House. For example, in 2004, when George W. Bush was president, Republican Senator Orrin Hatch of Utah dismissed the rule, saying "Strom Thurmond unilaterally on his own ... when he was chairman could say whatever he wanted to, but that didn't bind the whole committee, and it doesn't bind me." Kessler concludes that "both parties can be viewed as hypocritical, situational and prone to flip-flopping, depending on which party holds the presidency and/or the Senate."

== 2016 and 2020 controversies ==
The Thurmond Rule was raised again in public discourse in February 2016 after the death of Supreme Court Justice Antonin Scalia. President Barack Obama said he would nominate a candidate for the open seat, but with just under one year remaining in Barack Obama's second term, Republicans cited the Thurmond Rule when categorically refusing to vote on any Obama nominee.

Following the death of Justice Ruth Bader Ginsburg in September 2020, just over a month and a half before the next presidential election, Senate Majority Leader McConnell said that in contrast with 2016, Republican gains in the 2018 midterm elections two years before justified allowing a Republican Supreme Court nomination to go forward in the Senate during a presidential election year.

== See also ==
- Merrick Garland Supreme Court nomination § Biden rule
- Nomination and confirmation to the Supreme Court of the United States
- Judicial appointment history for United States federal courts
- List of nominations to the Supreme Court of the United States
- Unsuccessful nominations to the Supreme Court of the United States
