= Warren Commission =

Investigation of President Kennedy's assassination

- The President's Commission on the Assassination of President Kennedy

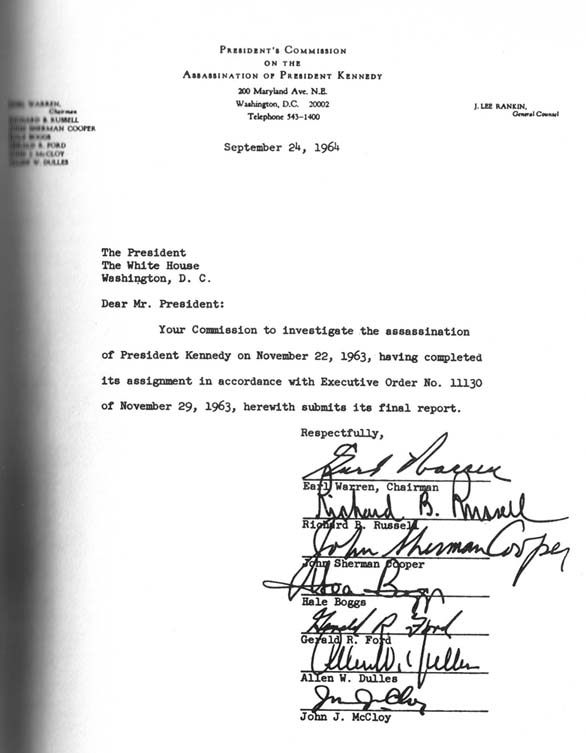
- Cover of final report

History
- Established by: Lyndon B. Johnson on November 29, 1963
- Disbanded: 1964
- Related Executive Order number(s): 11130

Membership
- Chairperson: Earl Warren
- Other committee members: Richard Russell Jr., John Sherman Cooper, Hale Boggs, Gerald Ford, Allen Dulles, John J. McCloy

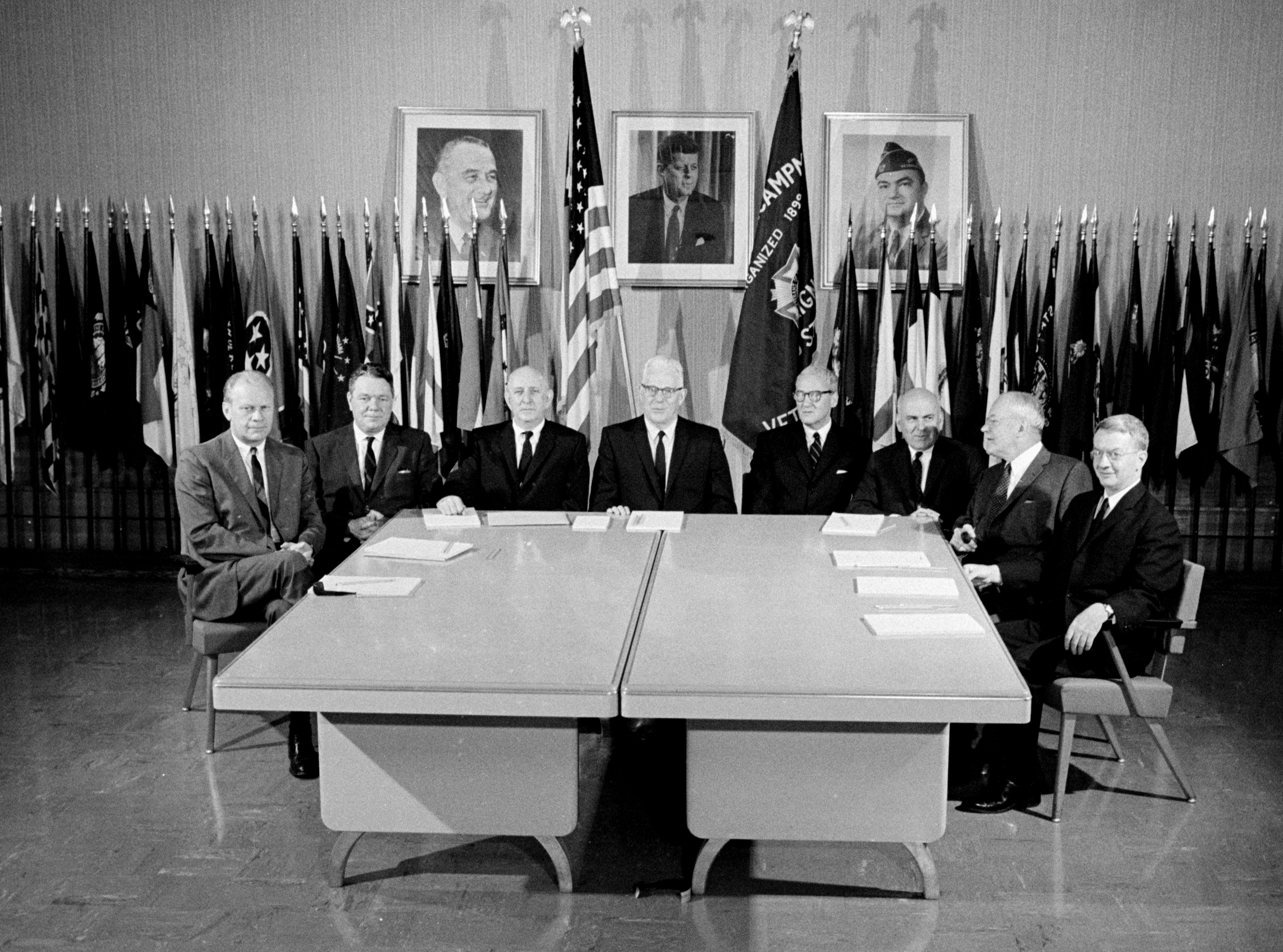
The Warren Commission on 14 August 1964.

The President's Commission on the Assassination of President Kennedy, known unofficially as the Warren Commission, was established by President Lyndon B. Johnson through Executive Order 11130 on November 29, 1963, to investigate the assassination of United States president John F. Kennedy that had taken place on November 22, 1963.

The U.S. Congress passed Senate Joint Resolution 137 authorizing the presidentially-appointed Commission to report on the assassination of President John F. Kennedy, mandating the attendance and testimony of witnesses and the production of evidence. Its 888-page final report was presented to President Johnson on September 24, 1964, and made public three days later.

It concluded that President Kennedy was assassinated by Lee Harvey Oswald and that Oswald acted entirely alone. It also concluded that Jack Ruby acted alone when he killed Oswald two days later. The Commission's findings have proven controversial and have been both challenged and supported by later studies.

The Commission took its unofficial name—the Warren Commission—from its chairman, Chief Justice Earl Warren. According to published transcripts of Johnson's presidential phone conversations, some major officials were opposed to forming such a commission and several commission members took part only reluctantly. One of their chief reservations was that a commission would ultimately create more controversy than consensus.

== Formation ==
The creation of the Warren Commission was a direct consequence of the murder of Kennedy's assassin Lee Harvey Oswald by Jack Ruby on November 24, 1963, carried out live on national television in the basement of the Dallas police station. The lack of a public process addressing the mistakes of the Dallas Police, who concluded that the case was closed, created doubt in the mind of the public.

The new president, Lyndon B. Johnson, himself from Texas, the state where the two assassinations had taken place, found himself faced with the risk of a weakening of his presidency. Confronted with the results obtained by the Texas authorities, themselves seriously discredited and criticized, he decided after various consultations, including in particular that with FBI director J. Edgar Hoover, to create a presidential commission of inquiry by Executive Order 11130 of November 29, 1963. This act made it possible both to avoid an independent investigation led by Congress and to avoid entrusting the case to the attorney general, Robert F. Kennedy, deeply affected by the assassination, whose federal jurisdiction would have been applied in the event of withdrawal of the share of the State of Texas for the benefit of the federal authorities in Washington.

Nicholas Katzenbach, Deputy Attorney General, provided advice that led to the creation of the Warren Commission. On November 25 he sent a memo to Johnson's White House aide Bill Moyers recommending the formation of a Presidential Commission to investigate the assassination. His motivation was to combat speculation of a conspiracy, in a memo he wrote: "The public must be satisfied that Oswald was the assassin; that he did not have confederates who are still at large.".

Four days after Katzenbach's memo, Johnson appointed to the commission some of the nation's most prominent figures, including Earl Warren, Chief Justice of the United States. At first, Warren refused to head the commission, citing the principle of law that a member of the judicial power could not be at the service of the executive power. It was only under pressure from President Lyndon Johnson, who spoke of international tensions and the risks of war resulting from the death of his predecessor, that he agreed to chair the commission. The other members of the commission were chosen from among the representatives of the Republican and Democratic parties, in both houses of Congress, and added diplomat John J. McCloy, former president of the World Bank, and former CIA director Allen Dulles.

The national image of the United States was also of concern. McCloy states that a motive of the commission was to "show the world that America is not a banana republic, where a government can be changed by conspiracy". Warren shared this concern, and in part agreed to head the commission after President Johnson made it clear to him that the "nation's prestige" was at stake.

== Meetings ==
The Warren Commission met formally for the first time on December 5, 1963, on the second floor of the National Archives Building in Washington, D.C. At this meeting, Warren explained the methodology he planned the commission to follow:

Now I think our job here is essentially one for the evaluation of evidence as distinguished from being one of gathering evidence, and I believe that at the outset at least, we can start with the premise that we can rely upon the reports of the various agencies that have been engaged in investigating the matter, the FBI, the Secret Service, and others that I may not know about at the present time.

For this reason, Warren opposed giving the commission the power of subpoena, however with the objection of the other commission members it was decided that the commission would have such powers.

The Commission conducted its business primarily in closed sessions, but these were not "secret" sessions. The witnesses were allowed to report what they said to whomever. Journalist Dorothy Kilgallen obtained a copy of Ruby's testimony to the Warren Commission, which he had given on June 7, 1964. Kilgallen published it in August 1964 in three installments on the front pages of the New York Journal-American, The Philadelphia Inquirer, the Seattle Post-Intelligencer, and other newspapers. In response the Warren Commission condemned what it called the "premature publication" of Ruby's testimony and announced that there would be a federal investigation as to how Kilgallen had received the testimony.

According to a 1963 FBI memo that was released to the public in 2008, Commission member Gerald Ford was in contact with the FBI throughout his time on the Warren Commission and relayed information to the deputy director, Cartha DeLoach, about the panel's activities.

== Members ==
Members of the Warren Commission

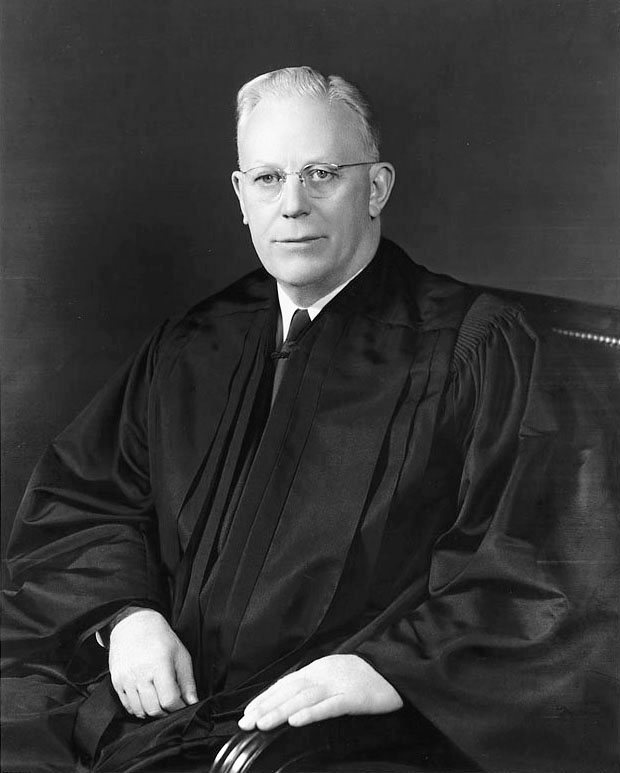
Earl Warren

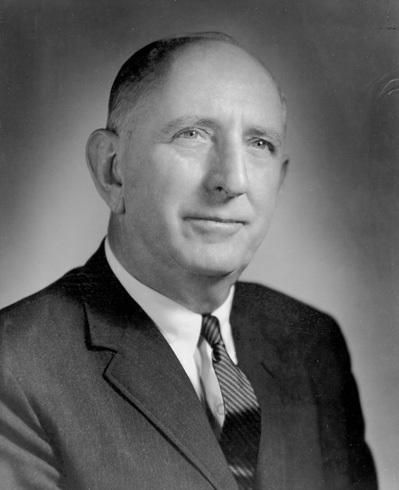
Richard Russell Jr.

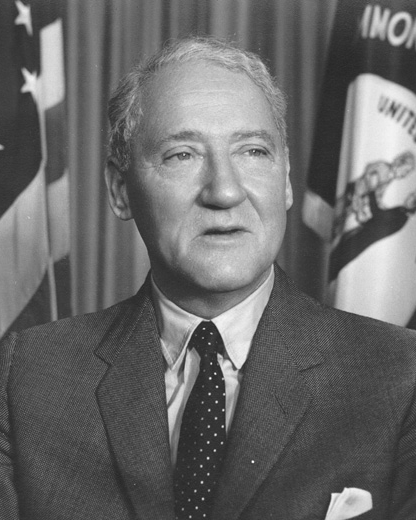
John Sherman Cooper

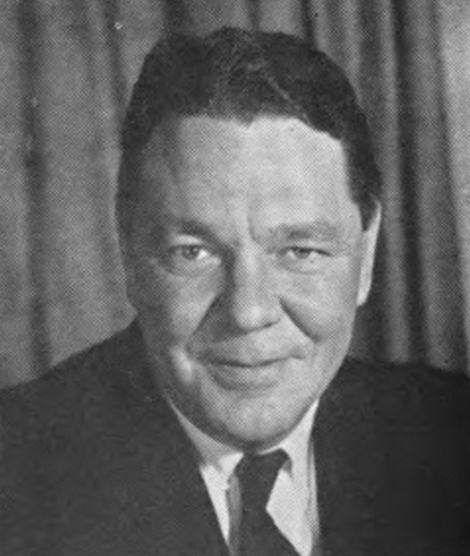
Hale Boggs

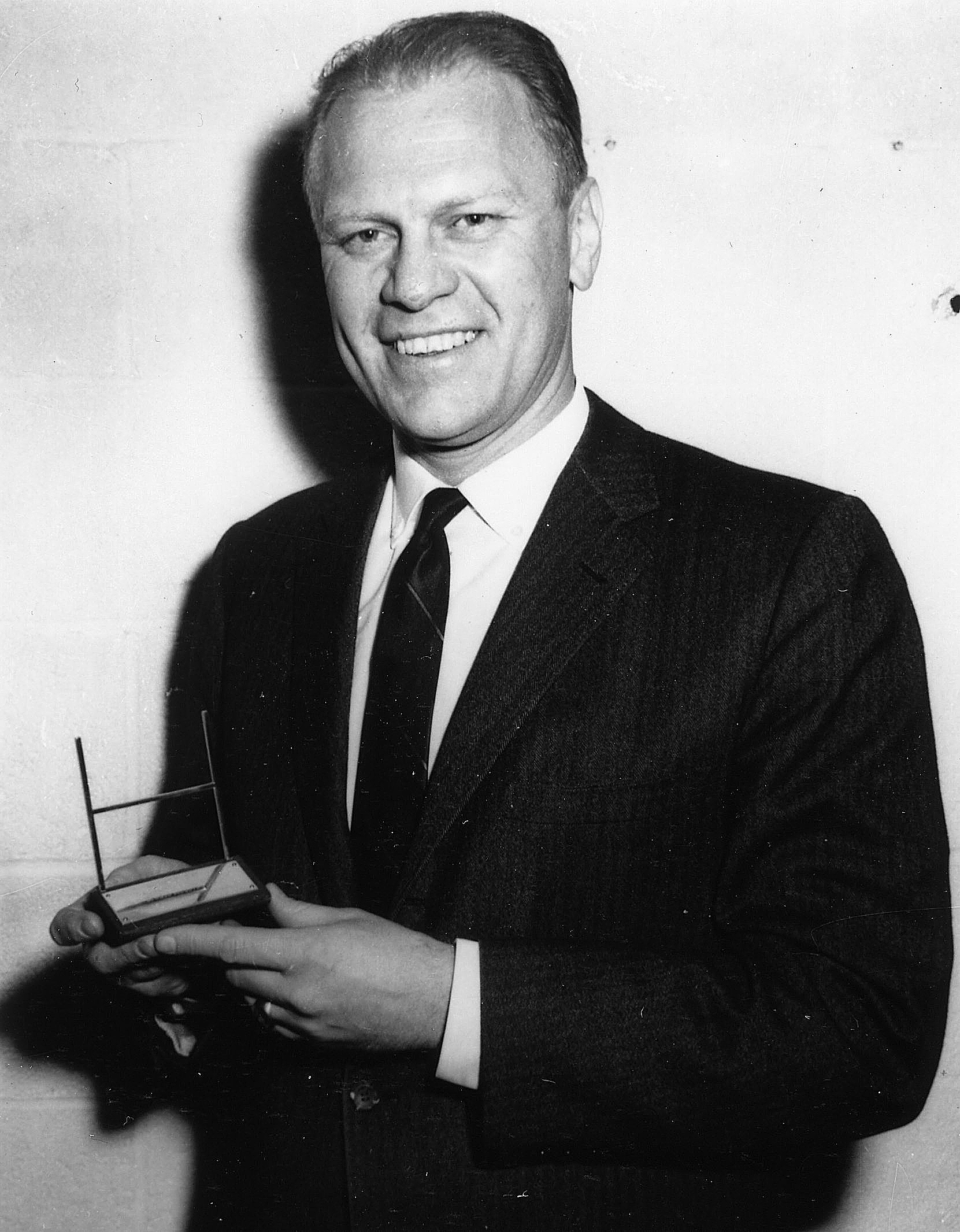
Gerald Ford

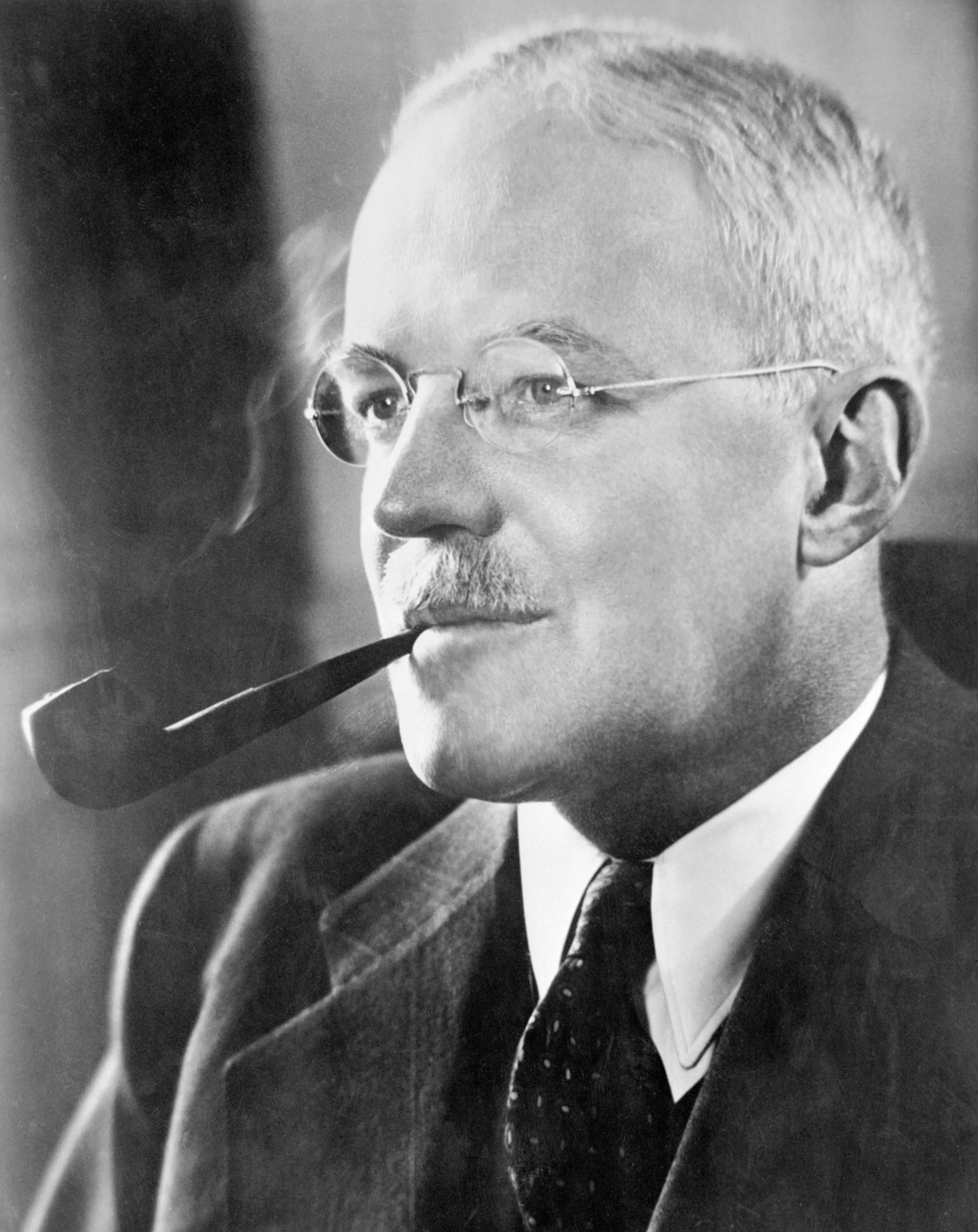
Allen Dulles

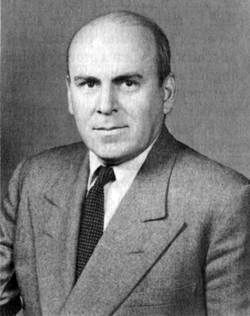
John J. McCloy

Committee

- Earl Warren, Chief Justice of the United States (chairman) (1891–1974)
- Richard Russell Jr. (D-Georgia), U.S. Senator (1897–1971)
- John Sherman Cooper (R-Kentucky), U.S. Senator (1901–1991)
- Hale Boggs (D-Louisiana), U.S. Representative, House Majority Whip (1914–1972)
- Gerald Ford (R-Michigan), U.S. Representative (later 38th President of the United States) (1913-2006)
- Allen Dulles, former Director of Central Intelligence and head of the Central Intelligence Agency (1893–1969)
- John J. McCloy, former president of the World Bank (1895–1989)

General counsel

- J. Lee Rankin (1907–1996)

Assistant counsel

- Francis W. H. Adams (1904–1990)
- Joseph A. Ball (1902–2000)
- David W. Belin (1928–1999)
- William Thaddeus Coleman Jr. (1920–2017)
- Melvin A. Eisenberg (1934–)
- Burt W. Griffin (1932–)
- Leon D. Hubert Jr. (1911–1977)
- Albert E. Jenner Jr. (1907–1988)
- Wesley J. Liebeler (1931–2002)
- Norman Redlich (1925–2011)
- W. David Slawson (1931–2023)
- Arlen Specter (1930–2012)
- Samuel A. Stern (1929–)
- Howard P. Willens (1931–) (liaison with the Department of Justice)

Staff

- Philip Barson (1912–1997)
- Edward A. Conroy (1920–1993)
- John Hart Ely (1938–2003)
- Alfred Goldberg (1918–2007)
- Murray J. Laulicht (1940–)
- Arthur K. Marmor (1915–1968)
- Richard M. Mosk (1939–2016)
- John J. O'Brien (1919–2001)
- Stuart R. Pollak (1937–)
- Alfredda Scobey (1912–2001)
- Charles N. Shaffer Jr. (1932–2015)
- Lloyd L. Weinreb (1936–2021)

== Conclusions of the report ==
The report concluded that:

1. The shots which killed President Kennedy and wounded Governor Connally were fired from the sixth-floor window at the southeast corner of the Texas School Book Depository.
2. President Kennedy was first struck by a bullet which entered at the back of his neck and exited through the lower front portion of his neck, causing a wound which would not necessarily have been lethal. The President was struck by a second bullet, which entered the right-rear portion of his head, causing a massive and fatal wound.
3. Governor Connally was struck by a bullet which entered on the right side of his back and traveled downward through the right side of his chest, exiting below his right nipple. This bullet then passed through his right wrist and entered his left thigh then it caused a superficial wound.
4. There is no credible evidence that the shots were fired from the Triple Underpass, ahead of the motorcade, or from any other location.
5. The weight of the evidence indicates that there were three shots fired.
6. Although it is not necessary to any essential findings of the Commission to determine just which shot hit Governor Connally, there is very persuasive evidence from the experts to indicate that the same bullet which pierced the President's throat also caused Governor Connally's wounds. However, Governor Connally's testimony and certain other factors have given rise to some difference of opinion as to this probability but there is no question in the mind of any member of the Commission that all the shots which caused the President's and Governor Connally's wounds were fired from the sixth-floor window of the Texas School Book Depository.
7. The shots which killed President Kennedy and wounded Governor Connally were fired by Lee Harvey Oswald.
8. Oswald killed Dallas Police Patrolman J. D. Tippit approximately 45 minutes after the assassination.
9. Ruby entered the basement of the Dallas Police Department and killed Lee Harvey Oswald and there is no evidence to support the rumor that Ruby may have been assisted by any members of the Dallas Police Department.
10. The Commission has found no evidence that either Lee Harvey Oswald or Jack Ruby was part of any conspiracy, domestic or foreign, to assassinate President Kennedy.
11. The Commission has found no evidence of conspiracy, subversion, or disloyalty to the U.S. Government by any Federal, State, or local official.
12. The Commission could not make any definitive determination of Oswald's motives.
13. The Commission believes that recommendations for improvements in Presidential protection are compelled by the facts disclosed in this investigation.

=== Internal disagreement ===
Notably, three of the Commission members, Sherman Cooper, Boggs, and Russell disagreed with the single-bullet theory advanced by the commission. Cooper felt its conclusions were "premature and inconclusive", and informed Attorney General Robert F. Kennedy and Senator Ted Kennedy that he strongly felt Lee Harvey Oswald had not acted alone. When Cooper expressed his same thoughts to Jacqueline Kennedy, he reportedly stated that "it's important for this nation that we bring the true murderers to justice."

Russell in particular was unhappy with the Commission's conclusions. His personal papers indicated that he was troubled by the Commission's single-bullet theory, the Soviet Union's failure to provide greater detail regarding Lee Harvey Oswald's period in Russia, and the lack of information regarding Oswald's Cuba-related activities. In a telephone conversation with President Johnson in September 1964 he expressed his disbelief in the single-bullet theory, to which Johnson replied that he did not believe it either. Russell had written a dissenting opinion for the Warren Commission that "a number of suspicious circumstances" could not allow him to agree that there was no conspiracy to kill Kennedy and that citing a lack of evidence he believed this "preclude[d] the conclusive determination that Oswald and Oswald alone, without the knowledge, encouragement or assistance of any other person, planned and perpetrated the assassination". With Russell's agreement this statement was not included in the final report. He had also made a request to Warren that "Senator Russell dissents" be placed in a footnote of the final report, although Warren refused to do so, insisting that there must be unanimity among the Commission.

Senator Boggs privately stated that he "had strong doubts about it", referring to the single bullet theory, and that FBI director J. Edgar Hoover "lied his eyes out to the Commission, on Oswald, on Ruby, on their friends, the bullet, the gun, you name it". However publicly Boggs took another position, in a 1966 appearance on Face the Nation, Boggs defended the commission's findings and stated that he did not doubt that Lee Harvey Oswald killed Kennedy. He said that all the evidence indicated that Kennedy was shot from behind and that the argument that one bullet hit both Kennedy and Texas Governor John Connally was "very persuasive".

== Death of Lee Harvey Oswald ==
In response to Jack Ruby's shooting of Lee Harvey Oswald, the Warren Commission declared that the news media must share responsibility with the Dallas police department for "the breakdown of law enforcement" that led to Oswald's death. In addition to the police department's "inadequacy of coordination", the Warren Commission noted that "these additional deficiencies [in security] were directly related to the decision to admit newsmen to the basement".

The commission concluded that the pressure of press, radio, and television for information about Oswald's prison transfer resulted in relaxed security standards for admission to the basement, allowing Ruby to enter and subsequently shoot Oswald, noting that "the acceptance of inadequate press credentials posed a clear avenue for a one-man assault." Oswald's death was said to have been a direct result of "the failure of the police to remove Oswald secretly or control the crowd in the basement."

The consequence of Oswald's death, according to the Commission, was that "it was no longer possible to arrive at the complete story of the assassination of John F. Kennedy through normal judicial procedures during the trial of the alleged assassin." While the Commission noted that the prime responsibility was that of the police department, it also recommended the adoption of a new "code of conduct" for news professionals regarding the collecting and presenting of information to the public that would ensure "there [would] be no interference with pending criminal investigations, court proceedings, or the right of individuals to a fair trial."

== Aftermath ==
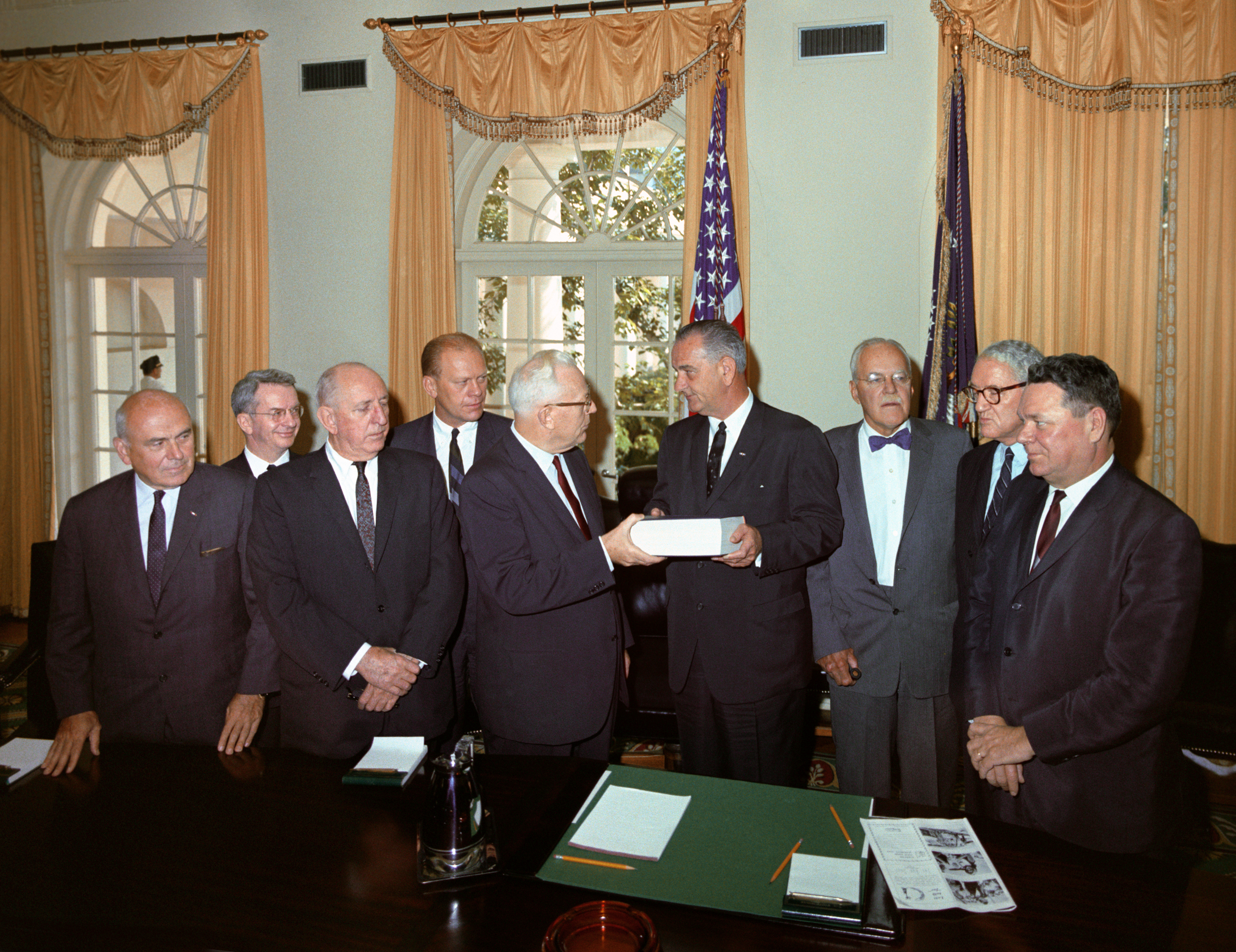
The Warren Commission presents its report to President Johnson. From left to right: John McCloy, J. Lee Rankin (General Counsel), Senator Richard Russell, Congressman Gerald Ford, Chief Justice Earl Warren, President Lyndon B. Johnson, Allen Dulles, Senator John Sherman Cooper, and Congressman Hale Boggs.

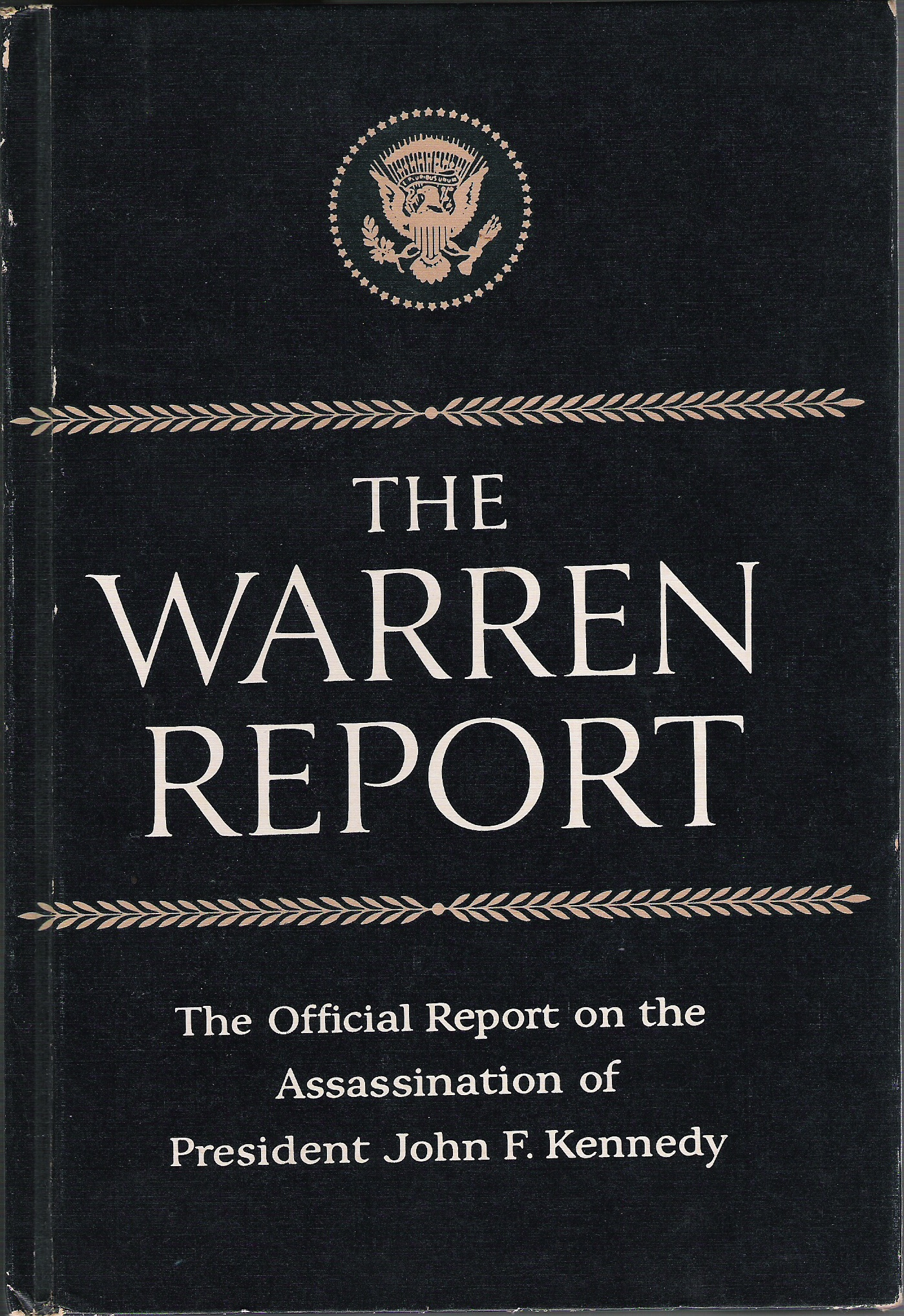
The Warren Report reproduced in book form by the Associated Press

=== Secret Service ===
The findings prompted the Secret Service to make numerous modifications to its security procedures. The Commission made other recommendations to the Congress to adopt new legislation that would make the murder of the President (or Vice-President) a federal crime, which was not the case in 1963.

== Report and records ==
In 1964 a New York Times edition of the Warren Report was published featuring an introduction by Harrison Salisbury and articles by other Times journalists praising the report.

In November 1964, two months after the publication of its 888-page report, the commission published twenty-six volumes of supporting documents, including the testimony or depositions of 552 witnesses and more than 3,100 exhibits making a total of more than 16,000 pages. The Warren Report, however, lacked an index, which greatly complicated the work of reading. It was later endowed with an index by the work of Sylvia Meagher for the report and the twenty-six volumes of documents.

All of the commission's records were then transferred on November 23 to the National Archives. The unpublished portion of those records was initially sealed for seventy-five years (to 2039) under a general National Archives policy that applied to all federal investigations by the executive branch of government, a period "intended to serve as protection for innocent persons who could otherwise be damaged because of their relationship with participants in the case."

The 75-Year Rule no longer exists, supplanted by the Freedom of Information Act of 1966 and the JFK Records Act of 1992. By 1992, ninety-eight percent of the Warren Commission records had been released to the public. Six years later, after the Assassination Records Review Board's work, all Warren Commission records, except those records that contained tax return information, were available to the public with redactions.

The remaining Kennedy assassination-related documents were partly released to the public on October 26, 2017, twenty-five years after the passage of the JFK Records Act. President Donald Trump, as directed by the FBI and the CIA, took action on that date to withhold certain remaining files, delaying the release until April 26, 2018, then on April 26, 2018, took action to further withhold the records "until 2021".

== CIA "benign cover-up" ==
According to a report by the CIA Chief Historian David Robarge (which was released to the public in 2014), CIA Director McCone was complicit in a Central Intelligence Agency "benign cover-up" by withholding information from the Warren Commission. According to this report, CIA officers had been instructed to give only "passive, reactive, and selective" assistance to the commission, to keep the commission focused on "what the Agency believed at the time was the 'best truth' — that Lee Harvey Oswald, for as yet undetermined motives, had acted alone in killing John Kennedy." The CIA may have also covered up evidence of being in communication with Oswald before 1963, according to the 2014 report findings.

Also withheld were earlier CIA plots, involving CIA links with the Mafia, to assassinate Cuban president Fidel Castro, which might have been considered to provide a motive to assassinate Kennedy. The report concluded, "In the long term, the decision of John McCone and Agency leaders in 1964 not to disclose information about CIA's anti-Castro schemes might have done more to undermine the credibility of the Commission than anything else that happened while it was conducting its investigation."

== Skepticism ==
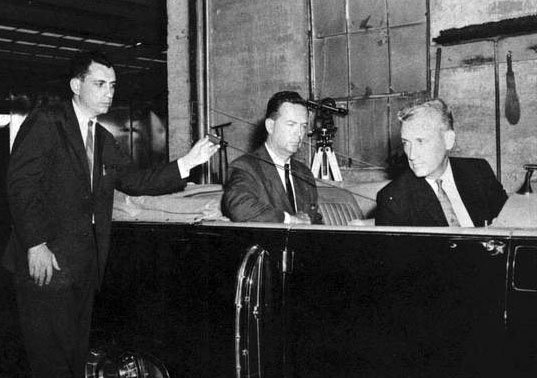
Arlen Specter reproducing the assumed alignment of the single-bullet theory

Many independent investigators, journalists, historians, jurists, and academics issued opinions opposing the conclusions of the Warren commission based on the same elements collected by its works.

These skeptics and their works included Thomas Buchanan, Sylvan Fox, Harold Feldman, Richard E. Sprague, Mark Lane's Rush to Judgment, Edward Jay Epstein's Inquest, Harold Weisberg's Whitewash, Sylvia Meagher's Accessories After the Fact or Josiah Thompson's Six Seconds in Dallas.

English historian Hugh Trevor-Roper wrote: "The Warren Report will have to be judged, not by its soothing success, but by the value of its argument. I must admit that from the first reading of the report, it seemed impossible to me to join in this general cry of triumph. I had the impression that the text had serious flaws. Moreover, when probing the weak parts, they appeared even weaker than at first sight."

In September 1966, Congressman Theodore R. Kupferman, citing articles and books critical of the commission, proposed a 10-member joint Senate-House committee to review the Warren Commission's work and conclusions, but the proposal was not acted on.

In 1992, following popular political pressure in the wake of the film JFK, the Assassination Records Review Board (ARRB) was created by the JFK Records Act to collect and preserve the documents relating to the assassination. In a footnote in its final report, the ARRB wrote: "Doubts about the Warren Commission's findings were not restricted to ordinary Americans. Well before 1978, President Johnson, Robert F. Kennedy, and four of the seven members of the Warren Commission all articulated, if sometimes off the record, some level of skepticism about the Commission's basic findings."

== Weak points of the report ==
The Warren Commission argued that direct witnesses to the shooting, who immediately rushed en masse to the grassy knoll after the shots were fired, were fleeing the area of the shooting. In reality, the people present, including a dozen members of the security forces, in particular Sheriff Decker's team, who had given the order to investigate the area, all testified that they were running to the search for one or more shooters posted on the grassy Knoll.

The Commission did not examine photographs or X-rays of President Kennedy's body, although they did have the power to subpoena them. Commission member John J. McCloy later said that "I think that if there’s one thing that I would do over again, I would insist on those photographs and the X-rays having been produced before us", while Commission staff counsel David W. Belin referred to this omission as "perhaps the biggest blunder" the Commission made.

It did not interview John Fitzgerald Kennedy's personal doctor, George Burkley, who was present during the shooting in the convoy of official vehicles then at Parkland Hospital, on board Air Force One, then at Bethesda Naval Hospital during the autopsy. He signed the death certificate and also took delivery of the brain of John Fitzgerald Kennedy which is declared lost in the National Archives. Concerning the conclusions of the Warren commission about the three shots, the practitioner had declared in 1967: "I would not like to be quoted on this subject".

The ballistic reports conducted by the FBI and the autopsy reports were not the subject of any counter-investigation, which made the commission directly dependent on the work of the latter. The Warren Commission, by decision of Earl Warren, refused to hire its own independent investigators. However, it had its own investigative capacity thanks to direct access to the emergency presidential budget funds granted by President Lyndon Johnson when it was created, to conduct its own investigations. Thus the Warren commission was not informed by the FBI of the discovery the day after the attack, on November 23, 1963, by a medical student, William Harper, of a piece of occiput located at the rear left in relation to at the position of the presidential limo during the fatal shot to the head. He had it examined by the professor and medical examiner, Doctor Cairns who measured it and photographed this piece before informing the FBI, on November 25, 1963. The latter received instructions not to make any publicity on this subject. It was the Attorney General, Robert F. Kennedy, who, informed by a letter from Dr. Cairns transmitted to the Warren Commission, allowed the latter to question the practitioner. The non-use by the members of the Warren Commission of the direct elements of the autopsy such as notes, photos and x-rays. He only used drawings by FBI artists reproducing photographic images.

The revelation by Edward Jay Epstein, in his book Inquest published in 1966, that as early as the beginning of 1964, the chief adviser, J. Lee Rankin, had given the outcome of the results of the work of the commission: guilt of Oswald, the latter having acted alone. Even before the creation of the commission, on November 25, 1963, and a few hours after the assassination of Lee Harvey Oswald by Jack Ruby in the premises of the Dallas police, Nicolas Katzenbach, assistant attorney general, had indicated in a memorandum intended of Bill Moyers that: "The public must be convinced that Oswald was the killer; that he had no accomplices still at large; and that evidence was such that he would have been found guilty at trial" creating a political orientation of the results of the investigation, even before the start of the first official investigations and knowledge of the results. Its objective was to cut short the speculations of public opinion either on a plot of communist origin (thesis of the Dallas police) or a plot fomented by the far right to blame the communists (hypothesis defended by the press of communist bloc formed around the USSR).

As early as the 1970s, official members of the Warren Commission questioned its work, in particular Hale Boggs who criticized the influence of J. Edgar Hoover, the director of the FBI from 1924 to 1972, who had centralized all of the information from the FBI agents before synthesizing it and transmitting it to the Warren Commission. He campaigned for a reopening of the file considering that the director of the FBI had lied to the Warren commission. He disappeared in a plane crash in October 1972.

Commission member Richard Russell told the Washington Post in 1970 that Kennedy had been the victim of a conspiracy, criticizing the commission's no-conspiracy finding and saying "we weren't told the truth about Oswald". John Sherman Cooper also considered the ballistic findings to be "unconvincing". Russell also particularly rejected Arlen Specter's "single bullet" theory, and he asked Earl Warren to indicate his disagreement in a footnote, which the chairman of the commission refused.

== Other investigations ==
Four other U.S. government or senate investigations have been conducted about the Warren Commission's conclusion or its material in different circumstances. The Church Committee analyzed in 1976 the work of the CIA and FBI which had communicated the different elements to the Warren Commission Members. The three others concluded with the initial conclusions that two shots struck JFK from the rear: the 1968 panel set by Attorney General Ramsey Clark, the 1975 Rockefeller Commission, and the 1978-79 House Select Committee on Assassinations (HSCA), which reexamined the evidence with the help of the largest forensics panel and bringing new materials to the public.

=== The Church Committee ===
In 1975, the Church Committee was created per US Senate after the revelations about illegal actions of federal agency as the FBI, CIA and IRS on the territory of the United States of America and after the political Watergate scandal. The Church Committee carried out investigative work on the assassination of John F. Kennedy on November 22, 1963, questioning 50 witnesses and accessing 3,000 documents.

It focuses on the necessary actions and the support provided by the FBI and the CIA to the Warren Commission and raises the question of the possible connection between the plans to assassinate political leaders abroad, in particular in relation to Fidel Castro in Cuba, a huge point of international tension in the 1960s, and that of the 35th President of the United States, John F. Kennedy. The Church Committee questioned the process of obtaining the information, blaming federal agencies for failing in their duties and responsibilities and concluding that the investigation into the assassination had been flawed.

The American Senator Richard Schweiker indicated on this subject, in a television interview on June 27, 1976: "The John F. Kennedy assassination investigation was snuffed out before it even began," and that "the fatal mistake the Warren Commission made was to not use its own investigators, but instead to rely on the CIA and FBI personnel, which played directly into the hands of senior intelligence".

The results of the Church Committee opened the way of the creation of the HSCA, with parallelly the March 6, 1975, first time diffusion on network television in the show Good Night America of the Zapruder film, which had been stored by Life magazine and never shown to the public during the preceding twenty years.

=== The House Select Committee on Assassinations ===
The HSCA involved Congressional hearings and ultimately concluded that Oswald assassinated Kennedy, probably as the result of a conspiracy. The HSCA concluded that Oswald fired shots number one, two, and four, and that an unknown assassin fired shot number three (but missed) from near the corner of a picket fence that was above and to President Kennedy's right front on the Dealey Plaza grassy knoll. However, this conclusion has also been criticized, especially for its reliance upon disputed acoustic evidence. The HSCA Final Report in 1979 did agree with the Warren Report's conclusion in 1964 that two bullets caused all of President Kennedy's and Governor Connally's injuries, and that both bullets were fired by Oswald from the sixth floor of the Texas School Book Depository.

In his September 1978 testimony to the HSCA, President Ford defended the Warren Commission's investigation as thorough. Ford stated that knowledge of the assassination plots against Castro may have affected the scope of the Commission's investigation but expressed doubt that it would have altered its finding that Oswald acted alone in assassinating Kennedy.

As part of its investigation, the HSCA also evaluated the performance of the Warren Commission, which included interviews and public testimony from the two surviving Commission members (Ford and McCloy) and various Commission legal counsel staff. The Committee concluded in their final report that the Commission was reasonably thorough and acted in good faith, but failed to adequately address the possibility of conspiracy: "...the Warren Commission was not, in some respects, an accurate presentation of all the evidence available to the Commission or a true reflection of the scope of the Commission's work, particularly on the issue of possible conspiracy in the assassination."

The HSCA also pointed to the role of the mafia in the attack because of Cuba. Indeed, the Cuban Castro Revolution of 1959 had caused the criminal organization to lose millions of dollars, which had tried in vain to win the favors of the Cuban leader during the change of regime. In 1959, the income generated by criminal activities amounted to an annual amount of 100 million dollars, i.e. 900 million reported in 2013.

The HSCA determined that the gradual change in policy of the Kennedy administration toward Cuba, first with the failure of the Bay of Pigs Invasion in April 1961, then more sustainably with the missile crisis of October 1962, in order to appease relations with the Cuban regime on a lasting basis and to open up new prospects, contributed to directing, if not slightly, within the many groups of paramilitary operations the most radical fringe of anti-Castro Cubans, American intelligence agents and Mafia criminals who continued their operations to overthrow the regime of Fidel Castro despite requests for formal arrests from the White House. The HSCA invited the Department of Justice to resume investigations. The latter would respond eight years later, arguing the absence of decisive evidence allowing the reopening of an investigation, which is equivalent to supporting the conclusions of Warren report.

== Legacy ==
The findings of the Warren Commission are generally highly criticized, and while the majority of American citizens believe that Oswald shot President Kennedy, the majority also believe that Oswald was part of a conspiracy and therefore do not believe the official thesis defended by the commission. In 1976, 81% of Americans disputed the findings of the Warren Report, 74% in 1983, 75% in 1993 and 2003. In 2009, a CBS poll indicated that 74% of respondents believed there had been an official cover-up by the authorities to keep the general public away from the truth.

== See also ==
- 9/11 Commission
- John F. Kennedy assassination conspiracy theories
- Presidential Commission
- Single-bullet theory
