= Arthur M. Young =

American inventor, philosopher, and author (1905–1995)

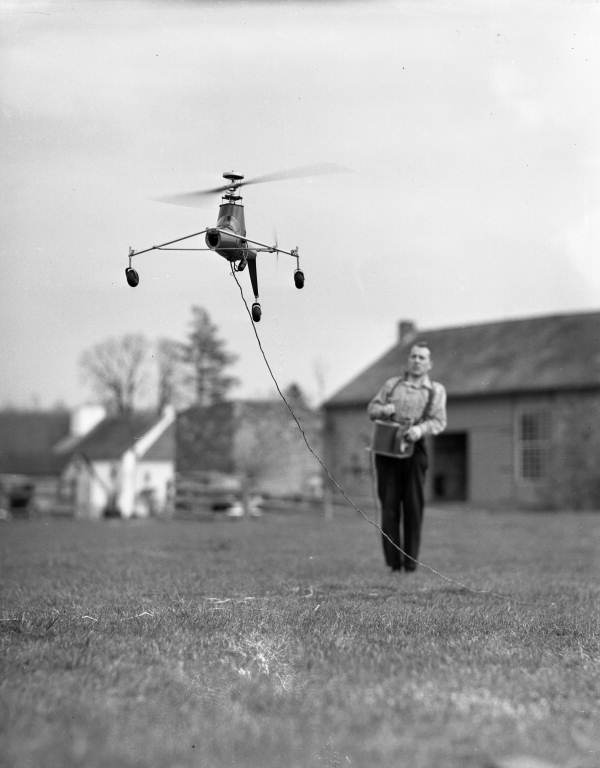
- Young controlling a model helicopter he built in 1941, photograph by Joseph Janney Steinmetz
- Born: Arthur Middleton Young; 3 November 1905; Paris, France
- Died: 30 May 1995 (aged 89); Berkeley, California
- Education: Miami University, Harvard University
- Known for: Contributing to helicopter design; book authorship
- Spouse(s): Priscilla Page (1933–1948 div.); Ruth Forbes Young (m. 1948)

Arthur Middleton Young (November 3, 1905 – May 30, 1995) was an American inventor, helicopter pioneer, philosopher, astrologer, and author. Young was the designer of Bell Helicopter's first helicopter, the Model 30, and inventor of the stabilizer bar used on many of Bell's early helicopter designs.

He founded the Institute for the Study of Consciousness in Berkeley in 1972. Young advocated process philosophy, an attempt to integrate the realm of human thought and experience with the realm of science so that the concept of universe is not limited to that which can be physically measured. Young's theory embraces evolution and the concept of the great chain of being. He influenced such thinkers as Stanislav Grof and Laban Coblentz.

== Early life ==
Arthur was the son of Eliza Coxe and Philadelphia landscape painter Charles Morris Young.

He was interested in developing a comprehensive theory of reality from an early age. He felt that to acquire the intellectual tools needed for such rigorous study, he should first develop an understanding of mathematics and engineering. With this decision, he was following a career path similar to that of philosopher Alfred North Whitehead, who was a mathematician before he developed his first process philosophy.

After graduating from Princeton University in 1927, Young searched for a suitable invention to develop. In 1928 he returned to his father's farm in Radnor, Pennsylvania, to begin twelve solitary years of efforts to develop the helicopter into a useful device.

== Career ==
Young's private experiments with helicopter design had mostly involved small scale models. After twelve years on his own, he took his results and models to the Bell Aircraft Company in Buffalo, New York, in 1941, and the company agreed to build full-scale prototypes. While war was looming for the US in late 1941, he was issued the key rotor stabilizer bar (also known as a flybar) patent, assigned it to Bell and moved to Buffalo to work with them. In June 1942, he moved his five-person team to Gardenville, New York, a hamlet on the north border of West Seneca, New York, where they could work in relative secrecy.

The first test flight of the prototype Model 30 occurred in July 1943. On March 8, 1946, the company received Helicopter Type Certificate H-1 for the world's first commercial helicopter, the Bell Model 47. This was the "whirlybird" featured in the M*A*S*H movie and television series, and was so successful that it continued to be manufactured through 1974. A design as well as a utilitarian success, it was added to the permanent collection of the Museum of Modern Art of New York City in 1984.

In August 1946 Young recorded in his notes the idea of the psychopter – the helicopter as the "winged self", a metaphor for the human spirit.

By October 1947, Young felt his work at Bell was complete, and he turned to the next phase of his career as a philosopher of mind (or soul).

== Philosophy ==
Young felt that his experiments and whole work life related to helicopters actually amounted to a digression from his enjoyment of philosophizing. He had become profoundly disturbed by the development of nuclear weapons at the end of World War II, and decided that humanity needed a new philosophical paradigm. He gradually developed a framework outlining what he thought could be applied universally: a pattern which he believed helped explain levels of evolution from energy (light) to matter, primordial organic life, animal life, human development, and humanity's ongoing evolution.

In 1949, the Franklin Institute awarded him the Edward Longstreth Medal.

In 1952, Young and his wife Ruth organized the Foundation for the Study of Consciousness in Philadelphia, the forerunner of the Institute for the Study of Consciousness.

Also in 1952, Young and Ruth participated in seances conducted by Andrija Puharich's Roundtable Foundation.

=== Marriages ===
Young married Priscilla Page in 1933. They were divorced in 1948. Later that year, he married artist Ruth Forbes Paine (1903–1998) of the Boston Forbes family, a great-granddaughter of Ralph Waldo Emerson and the mother of Michael Paine. Ruth was formerly married to George Lyman Paine Jr. Their son, Michael Paine, married Ruth Hyde Paine, a friend of Lee Harvey Oswald's wife, Marina Oswald, who was living with her at the time of the assassination of John F. Kennedy.

=== Death ===
On 30 May 1995, Arthur Young died of cancer aged 89, at his home in Berkeley, California.

== Works ==
- —; Musès, Charles, eds. (1972). Consciousness and reality; the human pivot point. New York: Outerbridge & Lazard. — distributed by Dutton
- — (1976). The Geometry of Meaning. New York: Delacorte Press/S. Lawrence.
- — (1976). The Reflexive Universe: evolution of consciousness. New York: Delacorte Press/S. Lawrence.
- — (1979). The Bell Notes: A Journey from Physics to Metaphysics. New York: Delacorte Press/S. Lawrence.
- — (1985). The Foundations of Science: The Missing Parameter. Robert Briggs Associates. ISBN 978-0931191039.
- — (1987). The Shakespeare/Bacon Controversy. Broadside Editions. Robert Briggs Associates. ISBN 978-0931191053.
- — (1988). Science and Astrology: The Relationship Between the Measure Formulae and the Zodiac. Anodos Foundation.
- — (2004). Nested Time: An Astrological Autobiography. Anodos Foundation.

== See also ==
- Noosphere
- List of American philosophers
