= Vincent Salandria =

JFK assassination researcher and author (1928–2020)

Vincent J. Salandria
- Born: Vincent Joseph Salandria; March 28, 1928; Philadelphia, Pennsylvania, U.S.
- Died: August 23, 2020 (aged 92); Philadelphia
- Occupations: Attorney, author
- Spouse: Livia Ciancaglini (divorced)
- Children: 1; Ernest
- Writing career
- Notable work: False Mystery (2004)

Vincent Salandria (March 28, 1928 – August 23, 2020) was a Philadelphia attorney who researched, wrote, and lectured about the assassination of President John F. Kennedy. Salandria was one of the most influential of the so-called "first-generation" Warren Commission critics who immediately questioned the findings of the U.S. government's official inquiry into JFK's murder. After spending several years identifying what he viewed as serious problems with the Warren Report's legal case against accused assassin Lee Harvey Oswald, Salandria came to believe that the government had conducted a deliberately shoddy investigation, that the assassination was in fact an assertion and display of power by the national security state. He articulated this theory in a series of lectures and articles, collected in his 2004 volume, False Mystery.

== Early years ==
Vincent Joseph Salandria was one of eight children of Italian immigrant parents who had settled in Philadelphia. As the first-born son in the family, Vincent was encouraged by his parents to become either a doctor or lawyer. He chose the latter profession and graduated from the University of Pennsylvania Law School in 1951. He specialized in labor law and civil liberties issues, and volunteered his legal services to the American Civil Liberties Union. He also obtained a teaching credential and by the autumn of 1963, was teaching social studies in the morning at Philadelphia's John Bartram High School, and working in the afternoon and evening at his private law practice.

== JFK assassination ==
On Friday afternoon, November 22, 1963, Salandria was driving from Bartram High School to his law office when he heard a radio bulletin that President Kennedy had been shot in Dallas, Texas. Salandria watched the TV news coverage that weekend with his brother-in-law Harold Feldman (Salandria's wife Livia was the sister of Feldman's wife Irma). The two men were instantly wary of the information being reported about prime suspect Lee Harvey Oswald. They did not believe that Oswald, with his repeated denials of guilt, fit the historic profile of a lone assassin. In his Introduction to the False Mystery anthology, Christopher Sharrett wrote that Salandria quickly suspected the assassination "reeked of a governmental coup, and that the confirmation of his suspicion would be the murder of the alleged suspect while in custody." When Oswald was in fact murdered in a Dallas jail on Sunday, November 24, Salandria embarked on a mission to learn more.

In the summer of 1964, he accompanied Harold and Irma Feldman on a trip to Dallas to interview witnesses, including Marguerite Oswald, Ruth and Michael Paine, and Helen Markham. Salandria studied the 888-page Warren Report when it was released in September 1964. On November 2, 1964, he published an article in the country's oldest daily law journal, The Legal Intelligencer. His article was titled "The Warren Report Analysis of Shots, Trajectories, and Wounds: A Lawyer's Dissenting View"; it was "the first sustained criticism of the Warren Commission's conclusions on the forensic evidence". Salandria attacked what he considered the physical impossibility of the single bullet theory. He asserted that the Warren Report "would have us believe that a trajectory of a bullet from the sixth story downward...changed direction in mid-air" in order to hit both President Kennedy and Texas Governor John Connally in the presidential limousine. Warren Commission General Counsel J. Lee Rankin disputed Salandria's assertion, stating "there was an alignment" between Kennedy and Connally in the limousine "which made it possible for one bullet to hit both men."

Salandria researched and wrote additional articles, printed in early 1965 in Liberation magazine, explaining what he regarded as glaring inconsistencies between the evidence collected in the 26-volume Warren Commission Hearings & Exhibits, and the Warren Report's summary of the evidence. He cited the descriptions by Dallas hospital staff of the wounds suffered by Kennedy and Connally, and argued that shots had to come "from at least two directions and therefore showed a conspiracy." During this period, The New York Times observed that while "public charges of conspiracy have just about ceased" vis-à-vis the JFK assassination, there were a handful of critics, such as Salandria in his recent Liberation articles, who were keeping the controversy alive.

1966 was a transitional year for Salandria. He published his last pieces devoted to specific aspects of the government's case against Oswald—"The Impossible Tasks of One Assassination Bullet", "The Separate Connally Shot", "Life Magazine and the Warren Commission"—and turned his attention to the political implications of the crime, and the American people's reactions to it. In an August 1966 article by Gaeton Fonzi in Greater Philadelphia Magazine, Salandria was quoted as saying: "If [the assassination] had happened in Smolensk or Minsk or Moscow, no American would have believed the story that was evolving about a single assassin, with all its built-in contradictions. But because it happened in Dallas, too many Americans were accepting it." By the end of 1966, he had shifted his focus to the "Big Picture", i.e., why Kennedy was killed rather than how he was killed.

When Salandria began lecturing about the assassination's "larger forces"—including the CIA and U.S. military—his views were met with skepticism. In a Page 1 profile of him in January 1967 in The Philadelphia Inquirer, Joe McGinniss wrote:

The CIA is very big in Vincent Salandria's theory.... It is crazy and horrible and when he talks about it you can't help but think that maybe he has been working too hard. "No," he said. "I'm not a nut. One of my great strengths is that I know myself very well and I know I'm not a nut. I arrived at this scientifically. It's not crazy. It makes a lot of sense." ... Vincent Salandria looked very sad when he talked about this part.... "They'll get Bobby killed and they'll get us all killed.... The [JFK] assassination was just the start. We have to worry about what's going on now. It doesn't matter who the actual assassins were. We have to get at the people in charge. They're the ones we have to expose." And the sad part was that Vincent Salandria really believed in everything he said.

Salandria was featured in a 1967 article by Calvin Trillin in The New Yorker about the early group of Warren Commission debunkers. That same year, Salandria reluctantly gave up teaching "because his fellow teachers at Bartram High School stopped talking to him; they couldn't abide his conspiracy theories, which Vince shared openly and constantly with his students." He went into administrative work for the Philadelphia School District, eventually becoming its assistant legal counsel.

Salandria spoke in Central Park on June 9, 1968, on the occasion of the Robert F. Kennedy assassination and the escalation of the Vietnam War. During his remarks, he listed U.S. foreign policy reversals that occurred after JFK's murder and said, "the military fired President Kennedy." Salandria's thesis was that the murder was a "Cold War killing—the bloody work of the U.S. military-intelligence system and its supporting civilian power elite"—to halt Kennedy's moves toward disengagement from Vietnam, and rapprochement with the Soviets and socialist Cuba.

In the run-up to the 1969 trial of Clay Shaw, Salandria aided New Orleans District Attorney Jim Garrison by identifying and exposing a government agent who had infiltrated Garrison's legal team. Salandria helped prepare the assistant district attorney, Alvin Oser, for his two-day cross-examination of JFK autopsy pathologist Pierre Finck. With Salandria's guidance, Oser was able to get Dr. Finck to admit on the witness stand that the autopsy was not controlled by chief pathologist Dr. James Humes, but instead by high-ranking military officers in attendance. In his 1970 book, A Heritage of Stone, Garrison's first acknowledgment was to Salandria. Garrison later sent a pre-publication copy of On the Trail of the Assassins to Salandria with the inscription: "To my intellectual mentor and friend."

In a 1971 address at a peace conference in Cambridge, Massachusetts, Salandria offered what he called "a model of explanation which fits the data of the [JFK] assassination and explains the why of it." He said what happened in Dallas and its aftermath was a "transparent conspiracy". He cited the Zapruder film and how it seemed to clearly indicate that an assassin was positioned in the right front of Kennedy and not (as the Warren Report insisted) behind him. Salandria then posed the question: "Why would the federal government on the one hand wish to provide us with data which prove a conspiracy to kill President Kennedy and simultaneously contend on the other hand that there was no conspiracy?" He determined that the assassination was "A Warning to Opponents": "The new rulers carefully and selectively orchestrated revelations of their bloody work, so as to gain therefrom the deference to which they felt they were entitled by their ascendancy to absolute power."

In a 1975 interview with Gaeton Fonzi, Salandria explained how he had come to realize that his initial research and writing about the assassination, which were aimed at revealing Warren Report contradictions regarding bullet trajectories and other low-level details, were beside the point:

I'm afraid we were misled. All the critics, myself included, were misled very early. I see that now. We spent too much time and effort microanalyzing the details of the assassination when all the time it was obvious, it was blatantly obvious that it was a conspiracy. Don't you think that the men who killed Kennedy had the means to do it in the most sophisticated and subtle way? They chose not to. Instead, they picked the shooting gallery that was Dealey Plaza and did it in the most barbarous and openly arrogant manner. The cover story was transparent and designed not to hold, to fall apart at the slightest scrutiny. The forces that killed Kennedy wanted the message clear: "We are in control and no one - not the President, nor Congress, nor any elected official - no one can do anything about it."

Salandria told Fonzi that JFK's assassination was similar to the murder of Italian socialist Giacomo Matteotti in 1924, adding that "Mussolini did everything but admit his complicity in the murder and then defied the authorities to prosecute him. When they did not, he went on to declare himself dictator." In an April 1977 essay, "The Design of the Warren Report, to Fall to Pieces", Salandria elaborated on his argument of a brazen state crime being committed as a demonstration of power.

== Personal life ==
In the 1950s, Salandria married the former Livia Ciancaglini, and they adopted a son, Ernest, born in 1959. By 1982, Salandria was divorced and found himself in the news again after Ernest, a longtime methamphetamine addict, privately confessed to his father that he was the perpetrator of the previously unsolved murder of Melvin Lee Jordan in August 1981. Salandria subsequently said that he felt "a moral obligation to go to the police", and so he telephoned a Philadelphia homicide detective with the information. Ernest was arrested and pled guilty to third-degree murder. He was sentenced in February 1983 to 6 years. Newspapers reported that Salandria's decision to turn in his son "climaxed an estranged relationship between father and son over Ernest's drug use".

In a 2012 article, Salandria alluded to the fact that he was remarried, and that his second wife was a Jewish woman whose father had been a leftist subpoenaed by the House Un-American Activities Committee, but details were not provided as to his wife's identity.

== Later years ==
After retiring from the Philadelphia School District, Salandria continued to speak about the meaning and significance of the JFK assassination. In a 1994 interview he said: "The Dealey Plaza killing of Kennedy did not only kill a president. It effectively killed the Presidency. Every president who has had to follow Kennedy...had to know what happened. Had to know therefore, what could happen, to him if he did not recognize where the power over the Presidency really lay." In November 1998 at the conference of the Coalition on Political Assassinations, Salandria delivered a lengthy speech titled "A False Mystery Concealing State Crimes", which chronicled his work on the assassination. He concluded his remarks by saying, "We can no longer afford to shield ourselves by asserting that the murder of President Kennedy is a mystery. There is no mystery regarding how, by whom, and why President Kennedy was killed. Only when we strip away our privileged cloak of denial about the truth of the killing will we be able to free ourselves for the hard global work of changing our unfair and brutal society to one that is more equitable and less violent."

For many decades, Salandria had a testy relationship with Warren Commission assistant counsel Arlen Specter, the developer of the single bullet theory, who became a U.S. Senator from Pennsylvania. As two Philadelphia lawyers who entered the profession at roughly the same time, Salandria and Specter were acquaintances before the JFK assassination put them at odds. In October 1964, at a Philadelphia Bar Association event honoring Specter and his recent work for the Warren Commission, Salandria confronted Specter with adversarial questions concerning the shots, trajectories and wounds during the assassination. Over the ensuing years, Salandria tried unsuccessfully to schedule a public debate about the Warren Report with Specter. In January 2012 when he was dying of cancer, Specter surprised Salandria by inviting him to lunch where the two men had "a courteous and respectful" exchange of views and reminiscences.

Salandria was one of the assassination researchers interviewed on-camera in the documentary film, The Assassination & Mrs. Paine.

On August 23, 2020, at age 92, Vincent Salandria collapsed and died while walking his dog in his Philadelphia neighborhood.

== Legacy ==
In Six Seconds in Dallas (1967), Josiah Thompson wrote that the "second generation" of Warren Commission critics—in which he included himself, Edward J. Epstein, Raymond Marcus, Léo Sauvage, and Richard Popkin—owe "a deep debt to Salandria's pioneering and largely unsung research." In his 1993 memoir The Last Investigation, Gaeton Fonzi described the impact that Salandria had on him. He recounted the unsettling experience of being a 29-year-old Philadelphia Magazine editor who met Salandria for the first time in late 1964, and heard the lawyer calmly say that "the Warren Commission Report was not the truth":

I thought he was crazy. If you do not recall that time, you cannot comprehend what a discordant thing it was then to contend that an official Government report might be wrong—especially one which had been issued by a panel of men with such lofty public reputations. I know it's hard for the post-Watergate generation to understand, but then almost everyone still believed what Government officials said. If someone like Salandria came along and suggested that an official Government report wasn't truthful...well, Salandria had to be nuts.

Ken Rahn said of Salandria's later work that he "was perhaps the first JFK researcher to come to believe that the truth of the assassination could be better approached by large-scale considerations than by focusing on details." James W. Douglass dedicated his bestseller JFK and the Unspeakable to Salandria and E. Martin Schotz.

In a posthumous tribute, assassination researcher James DiEugenio mentioned how Salandria had once compared himself to another prominent early Warren Commission critic, Mark Lane: "He [Salandria] thought Lane was standing up for civil liberties and the rule of law, whereas he was trying to expose the overthrow of the government. Lane was more popular than he was back in the 1963–66 period, since Vince did not think that the public was ready to digest his underlying message. He told me that it was only after the end of the Cold War that Americans would be ready to see that Kennedy's murder was not really an assassination but a coup d'état."

== Bibliography ==
=== Books ===
- * Kelin, John, ed. (2004). False Mystery: Essays on the Assassination of JFK. Louisville, Colorado: Square Deal Press. ISBN 978-0975494103. This book, which collects articles and speeches by Salandria, was first privately published in 1999 before its general release in 2004. It was re-released in 2017, edited by David Ratcliffe.

=== Selected articles ===
- "The Warren Report Analysis of Shots, Trajectories, and Wounds: A Lawyer's Dissenting View". The Legal Intelligencer. Vol. 151. November 2, 1964. He also published an addendum.
- "A Philadelphia Lawyer Analyzes the Shots, Trajectories, and Wounds". Liberation. Vol. IX, no. 10. January 1965.
- "A Philadelphia Lawyer Analyzes the President's Back and Neck Wounds". Liberation. Vol. X, no. 1. March 1965.
- "The Impossible Tasks of One Assassination Bullet". The Minority of One. Vol. VIII, no. 3. March 1966. pp. 12–18.
- "The Separate Connally Shot". The Minority of One. Vol. VIII, no. 4. April 1966. pp. 9–13.
- "Life Magazine and the Warren Commission". Liberation. Vol. XI, no. 7. October 1966. p. 44.
- "The Assassination of President John F. Kennedy: A Model for Explanation" (PDF). Computers and Automation. Vol. 20, no. 12. December 1971. pp. 32–40.
- "The Promotion of Domestic Discord". Computers and Automation. Vol. 21, no. 1. January 1972. pp. 37–39, 47.
- "The Design of the Warren Report, to Fall to Pieces" (PDF). People and the Pursuit of Truth. Vol. 2, no. 12. April 1977. pp. 2–6, 8.
- "JFK's assassination was a conspiracy". The Philadelphia Inquirer. January 26, 1992. p. 27 – via Newspapers.com.
- "The JFK Assassination: A False Mystery Concealing State Crimes". Fair Play. No. 27. March–April 1999. Speech delivered at the 1998 conference of the Coalition on Political Assassinations.
- "The Tale Told by Two Tapes". Kennedy Assassination Chronicles. 7 (1): 8–11, 30. May 2001.
- "Current Significance Of Making Robert Kennedy A Fall Guy In JFK Assassination". Kennedy Assassination Chronicles. 8 (3): 23–26. September 2002.
- "Notes on Lunch with Arlen Specter on January 4, 2012". Kennedys and King. December 4, 2012.
