= November 22, 1963: Reflections on the Life, Assassination, and Legacy of John F. Kennedy =

2013 book by Dean Owen

- Author: Dean R. Owen
- Publisher: Skyhorse Publishing
- Publication date: September 2013
- Publication place: United States

November 22, 1963: Reflections on the Life, Assassination and Legacy of John F. Kennedy is a book of approximately 90 reflections on John F. Kennedy by journalists, White House staff members, family and close friends, civil rights leaders, celebrities, and individuals who had encounters with him. It was compiled by journalist and author Dean R. Owen and published in September 2013 by Skyhorse Publishing.

== Content ==
Owen interviewed approximately 100 people for the book. He also conducted research at the John F. Kennedy Presidential Library and Museum. Among those whose reflections are included in the book are Tom Brokaw, Bob Schieffer, Letitia Baldrige, Congressman John Lewis, Julian Bond, Walter Mondale, Alex Trebek, Vincent Bugliosi, Nicholas Katzenbach, Joseph Califano, Lee Iacocca, Bob Arnot, Christopher Lawford, Robert F. Kennedy, Jr., Frank Mankiewicz, Roger Wilkins, Gary Hart, Cliff Robertson, Michael Medved, Rev. Billy Graham, Ruth Paine, John Seigenthaler, Stephen Schlesinger, Barry Goldwater, Jr., Helen Thomas, and Priscilla Johnson McMillan, as well as children of Robert McNamara, Dean Rusk, Walter Cronkite, Arthur Schlesinger, Jr. and Edward R. Murrow.

== Background ==
Owen, who was seven at the time of the assassination, says the tragedy was the catalyst for his interest and work in journalism and communications. Owen believes Kennedy's legacy is that of "a young and extraordinarily charismatic leader who was brilliant, witty and who inspired many Americans to pursue public service, though not necessarily politics, as a career." JFK also was "quite flawed", and those flaws include "how concerned he was about his age and his image, as well as the way history would judge his administration." Lee White, Special Counsel to the President, remarks in the book:

John Kennedy did not go peacefully over that little hump of turning forty. I remember the event even today. Sometimes we joke or make gags about turning forty, but he was not joking. I don’t quite know why, but I know damn well that he was not happy... it was a rude awakening, especially for a hot dog like he was.

== Reviews ==
Kirkus Reviews commented, "Keen observers of the president, members of his devoted staff, children of his advisers, civil rights leaders, eyewitness journalists and youth inspired by his brief, shining administration—all offer their concise statements and appraisals in veteran journalist Owen's collection. Some of the accounts are extracts from copyrighted statements evidently published in previous books, such as Walter F. Mondale's The Good Fight and Vincent Bugliosi's Reclaiming History, all of which expound poignantly on this most intimate 'death in the family.' Some of the statements are truly elucidating and mesmerizing… All walks of life are represented in this immense cross section of Americans' grief and groping for comprehension."
