= Washington Decoded =

Washington Decoded is a monthly online newsletter presenting articles on American history. Founded in March 2007 by editor Max Holland, the site publishes new pieces on the 11th of each month, with additional "extra" features. The site features book reviews and articles by authors, journalists, and scholars including John Earl Haynes, Harvey Klehr, Merle L. Pribbenow, Jeffrey T. Richelson, Sheldon M. Stern, and Holland, many of whose articles published elsewhere are also hosted on the site. It has hosted articles on a wide range of topics such as Watergate, Cold War History, 9/11, John F. Kennedy's assassination, and intelligence-related subjects. In November 2009, Washingtonian magazine featured a version of a WashingtonDecoded.com article on Richard Nixon's Deep Throat.

The banner of WashingtonDecoded.com features an edited quote from a 1946 George Orwell essay, "Political language . . . is designed to make lies sound truthful . . . and to give an appearance of solidity to pure wind."

== Editorial board ==
- David Barrett, professor, Villanova University;
- Barton Bernstein, professor, Stanford University;
- William Burr, senior analyst, National Security Archive;
- Thomas Ferguson, professor, University of Massachusetts;
- William Gaines, investigative reporter (ret.), Chicago Tribune;
- Irwin Gellman, author;
- John Haynes, historian, Library of Congress;
- Joan Hoff, professor, Montana State University;
- Mark Hulbert, editor, Hulbert Financial Digest;
- William Joyce, director, Special Collections, Penn State Libraries;
- Martin Kelly, professor (ret.), Hobart & William Smith Colleges;
- Mark Kramer, editor, Journal of Cold War Studies;
- Stanley Kutler, professor (ret.), University of Wisconsin;
- Patricia Lambert, author & journalist;
- Charles Lewis, professor, American University;
- Priscilla McMillan, author & journalist;
- Anna Nelson, professor, American University;
- Jay Peterzell, journalist;
- Thomas Powers, author & journalist;
- Leo Ribuffo, professor, George Washington University;
- Jeffrey Richelson, senior fellow, National Security Archive;
- Priscilla Roberts, lecturer, University of Hong Kong;
- Thomas Schwartz, professor, Vanderbilt University;
- Sheldon Stern, historian (ret.), John F. Kennedy Library;
- Jay Tolson, author & journalist;
- Alan Tonelson, research fellow, US Business and Industry Council Educational Foundation
- Richard Whalen, author & journalist
