= The Assassination & Mrs. Paine =

2022 documentary film about Ruth Paine

- Directed by: Max Good
- Written by: Max Good
- Produced by: Max Good
- Starring: Ruth Paine; Michael Paine; Max Holland; Jim DiEugenio; Vincent Salandria; Priscilla Johnson McMillan; David Lifton; Gerald Posner
- Narrated by: Max Good
- Cinematography: Max Good
- Edited by: Max Good
- Production company: Open Ranch Productions
- Distributed by: Journeyman Pictures
- Release date: June 14, 2022 (Online)
- Running time: 100 minutes
- Country: United States
- Language: English

The Assassination & Mrs. Paine is a 2022 documentary film directed by Max Good. The film explores the story of Ruth Paine, her former husband Michael Paine, and their connections to the JFK assassination. As a key witness and friend of Marina and Lee Harvey Oswald, Ruth Paine has long sparked speculation that she played a sinister role in a wider plot to frame Oswald.

== Festival screenings ==
- Ashland Independent Film Festival (2022)
- SF Docfest (2022)
- Atlanta Docufest (2022)
- San Antonio Film Festival (2022)
- New Haven Documentary Film Festival (2022)
- Revelation Perth International Film Festival (2022)

== Reception ==
Film reviewer Edward Curtin praised Good's editing and his willingness to let the audience hear both sides of the argument about Ruth Paine, i.e., "whether she is a truthful, naïve, Quaker do-gooder or a CIA asset, a pawn, or someone in deep denial." Another reviewer called the documentary an "extremely interesting yet unsatisfying affair". Joseph E. Green labeled it "brilliant" and wrote that "Good obtained unprecedented access to Ruth Paine and her answers to his ever-polite questions is utterly fascinating."

Paine herself, however, did not think highly of the film. She said in an interview, "What troubles me is, for instance there is this new DVD out... "Mrs. Paine and the murder of John F. Kennedy"... I asked him [Max Good], you know, what do you think, what is your opinion about the attempt on Walker and he (Max) says well I don't think that happened. So that's how some of the plot people, follow their stories, they just take what they want and leave the rest alone, and that is not good research."
