= Lyman Paine =

American architect and political activist (1901–1978)

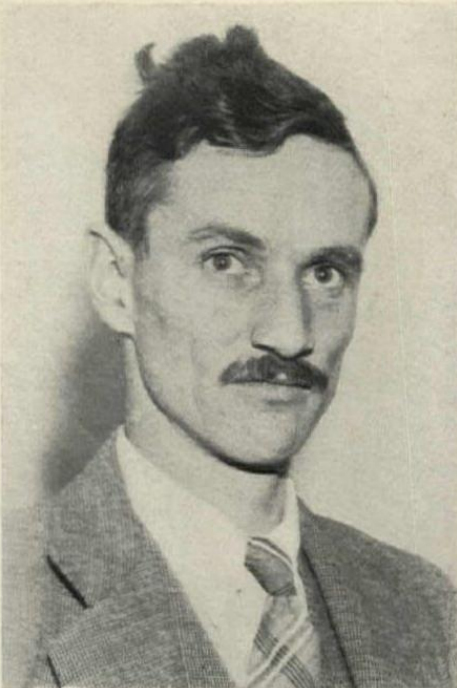
- Paine in 1936
- Born: George Lyman Paine Jr. November 16, 1901; New York City, U.S.
- Died: July 1, 1978 (aged 76); Los Angeles, California, U.S.
- Resting place: Sutton Island, Maine, U.S.
- Occupations: Architect; activist
- Spouses: Ruth Forbes (m. 1926; div. 1934) Frances Drake (m. 1939)
- Children: 2, including Michael
- Father: George Lyman Paine Sr.
- Relatives: Robert Treat Paine (grandfather)

George Lyman Paine Jr. (November 16, 1901 – July 1, 1978), was an American architect and radical left activist. He is known for his work with the Correspondence Publishing Committee with his second wife Frances Drake Paine, and was closely associated with James Boggs and Grace Lee Boggs.

== Early life and first marriage ==
Lyman Paine was born in New York City, New York, in November 1901. His father, George Lyman Paine Sr., was an Episcopal priest and a Christian Socialist, the son of philanthropist Robert Treat Paine. After graduating from Harvard University in 1922, G. Lyman Jr. became an architect. He married Ruth Forbes of the distinguished Forbes family in March 1926.

In 1926–1932, while living in New York City, the Paines became known for their apartment socials; one frequent social attendee, Mary Bancroft, wrote in her autobiography about her friend Ruth Forbes Paine's husband: "Lyman, ... was interested in what he termed 'The Ultimate Reality', which I interpreted as my old friend, 'Truth'. Lyman and I had endless discussions about this ultimate reality while sipping highballs of bathtub gin and ginger ale." After having two sons, Michael Paine and Cameron Paine, the couple separated about 1932 and were divorced in 1934.

Lyman and Ruth's son Michael Paine married Ruth Hyde and they both were acquaintances of Lee Harvey Oswald and his wife, Marina Oswald, in the months leading up to the assassination of President John F. Kennedy.

== Later life and second marriage ==
In the mid-1930s, while working for the New York City Housing Authority, Lyman became disillusioned with the utility of his work designing housing projects to produce social improvement, and he became active in Marxist politics. In 1934, shortly after finishing a Museum of Modern Art exhibit on the state of New York City slums, he met Frances "Freddy" Drake (3/21/1912–5/3/1999), whom he married in 1939. Then in 1947, on the occasion of the 25th anniversary of the Harvard College Class of 1922, Lyman wrote in their publication, the 25th Annual Report of the Harvard Class of 1922:

I came into contact with Marxism. The writings of Karl Marx, V.I. Lenin, Frederick Engels and Leon Trotsky opened new doors upon an old world. ... I became a follower of Leon Trotsky and a partisan of the world working class.

Lyman and Freddy Paine were early members of the Johnson-Forest Tendency, a group within the Trotskyist Socialist Workers Party which included Grace Lee Boggs and her husband James Boggs. The Johnson-Forest group split from the main current of the Trotskyist left at the beginning of the 1950s, setting up the Correspondence Publishing Committee which produced the newspaper Correspondence. When Johnson-Forest founder C. L. R. James left the group in 1962, the Paines remained with the Committee and the Boggses.

George Lyman Paine Jr died on July 1, 1978, while living in the County of Los Angeles, California, at the age of 76. His second wife, Frances 'Freddy' Drake Paine, died on May 3, 1999, also while living in California. Both, however, are buried on Sutton Island, Maine, where they had summered for many years.

== Writings ==
- Towards understanding Russia. I. Report of the British Quaker mission to Moscow, 1951. II. Objective thinking on communism 1952
- Sutton Island, Maine: its houses, people, animals, weather 1963
- Conversations in Maine 1967, 2018
