= Max Holland =

American journalist and writer (born 1950)

- Born: 1950 (age 75–76); Providence, Rhode Island, U.S.
- Education: Antioch College
- Occupation: Journalist

Max Holland (born 1950) is an American journalist, author, and the editor of Washington Decoded, an internet newsletter on United States history that began publishing March 11, 2007. He is currently a contributing editor to The Nation and The Wilson Quarterly, and sits on the editorial advisory board of the International Journal of Intelligence and CounterIntelligence. His articles have appeared in The Atlantic, American Heritage, The Washington Post, The New York Times, Los Angeles Times, The Boston Globe, The Baltimore Sun, Studies in Intelligence, the Journal of Cold War Studies, Reviews in American History, and online at History News Network.

Holland's published books include: Leak: Why Mark Felt Became Deep Throat (2012); The Kennedy Assassination Tapes: The White House Conversations of Lyndon B. Johnson Regarding the Assassination, the Warren Commission, and the Aftermath (2004); The CEO Goes to Washington: Negotiating the Halls of Power (1994); and When the Machine Stopped: A Cautionary Tale from Industrial America (1989). In 2011, he was the lead consultant for a National Geographic Channel documentary about the assassination of John F. Kennedy that premiered in November 2011, entitled JFK: The Lost Bullet. He appeared in the 2022 documentary The Assassination & Mrs. Paine.

In 2001, Holland won the J. Anthony Lukas Work-in-Progress Award, bestowed jointly by Harvard University's Nieman Foundation for Journalism and the Columbia University Graduate School of Journalism, for the book that became The Kennedy Assassination Tapes. That same year he won a Studies in Intelligence Award from the Central Intelligence Agency. Holland lives in Washington, D.C.

Holland is a 1972 graduate of Antioch College.

== Awards and fellowships ==
- 1990 - Fellowship. National Endowment for the Humanities, Washington, D.C.
- 1991 - Fellowship. Woodrow Wilson International Center for Scholars, Washington, D.C.
- 1998 - Fellowship. John Nicolas Brown Center for the Study of American Civilization, Brown University, Providence, RI.
- 2001 - J. Anthony Lukas Work-in-Progress Award. Columbia University School of Journalism and Harvard University Nieman Foundation.
- 2001 - Studies in Intelligence Award. Center for the Study of Intelligence, Central Intelligence Agency.
- 2004 - Moody Research Grant. Lyndon B. Johnson Foundation, Austin, TX.

== Selected publications ==
=== Articles ===
- "Citizen McCloy." The Wilson Quarterly, vol. 15, no. 4 (Autumn 1991), pp. 22–42. JSTOR 40258158. Full issue.
- "The Lie That Linked CIA to the Kennedy Assassination: The Power of Disinformation." Studies in Intelligence, no. 45, no. 5 (Fall-Winter 2001). Published by the Central Intelligence Agency.
- "The 'Photo Gap' that Delayed Discovery of Missiles: Politics and Intelligence." Studies in Intelligence, vol. 49, no. 4 (Sep. 2005), pp. 15–30. Published by the Central Intelligence Agency.
- "Private Sources of U.S. Foreign Policy: William Pawley and the 1954 Coup d'État in Guatemala." Journal of Cold War Studies, vol. 7, no. 4 (Oct. 2005), pp. 36–73. The MIT Press. JSTOR 26925851.

=== Books ===
- When the Machine Stopped: A Cautionary Tale from Industrial America. Boston, Ma.: Harvard Business School Press (1989). ISBN 0875842445, 978-0875842448.
- The CEO Goes to Washington: Negotiating the Halls of Power. Knoxville, Tenn.: Whittle Direct Books (1994). ISBN 1879736209, 978-1879736207.
- From Industry to Alchemy: Burgmaster, A Machine Tool Company. Washington, D.C.: Beard Books (2002). ISBN 158798153X, 978-1587981531.
- The Kennedy Assassination Tapes: The White House Conversations of Lyndon B. Johnson Regarding the Assassination, the Warren Commission, and the Aftermath. New York: Alfred Knopf (Sep. 2004). ISBN 1400042380, 978-1400042388.
- Leak: Why Mark Felt Became Deep Throat. Lawrence, Kan.: University Press of Kansas (Mar. 2012). ISBN 0700618295, 978-0700618293.
- Blind Over Cuba: The Photo Gap and the Missile Crisis. College Station, Tex.: Texas A&M University Press (2012). ISBN 1603447687, 978-1603447683.

== Works cited ==
- "Max Holland." Contemporary Authors Online. 2006. Biography Resource Center. Thomson Gale. September 25, 2006
- "Random House: Authors: Max Holland." Random House. 2006. Random House, Inc.. September 19, 2006.
