= Laban Coblentz =

Laban L. Coblentz
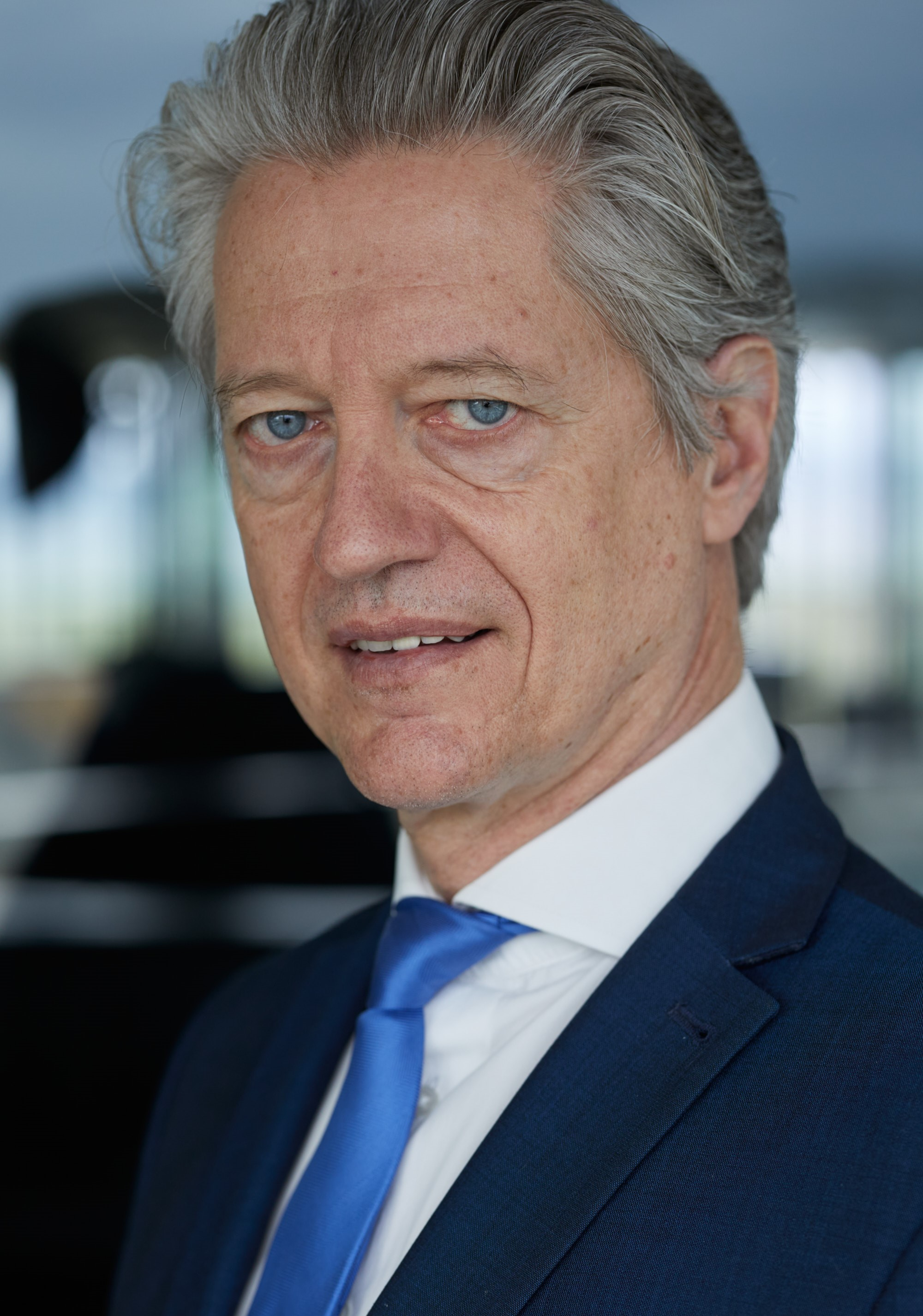
- Laban Coblentz at ITER, 2022
- Born: July 21, 1961 (age 65); Ohio
- Citizenship: United States
- Education: Malone University (BA); San Francisco State University (MA)
- Occupations: Writer, educator, science policy adviser, international civil servant, entrepreneur

Laban L. Coblentz (born July 21, 1961) is an American writer, educator, science policy adviser, international civil servant, and entrepreneur. Since 2015, Coblentz has served as the Head of Communication of ITER, the international nuclear fusion research and engineering megaproject.

== Early life and schooling ==
=== Home life ===
Coblentz was raised in a pacifistic and insular Amish Mennonite community in Hartville, Ohio. Although the community as a whole was skeptical of higher education and advanced technology, Coblentz has described his father, Alvin S. Coblentz, as a "self-taught researcher, educator, and 'technologist' of sorts: a watch and clock repairman." A biography of Alvin describes his design of a mechanical device that enabled the operation of an automobile accelerator and brake with a single pedal, compensating for his physical disability and allowing him to get a driver's license.

=== Malone University ===
Despite pressure from his church leaders to be content with a high-school education, Coblentz attended Malone University, a nearby Quaker college, earning a Bachelor of Arts degree in English and Psychology in 1982. At Malone, Coblentz took up journalism and fiction, becoming the editor of the campus newspaper and the literary magazine. He also dabbled in theater – a creative outlet that had been forbidden during his early years – taking leading roles in four consecutive university productions, and writing and directing his first play, The Playground.

=== United States Navy ===
Shortly after leaving Malone, Coblentz enlisted in the United States Navy, a decision that led to excommunication from his Amish Mennonite congregation. From 1983 to 1985 he studied reactor physics, nuclear propulsion engineering and radiochemistry at the Naval Nuclear Power School in Orlando and a small reactor prototype in Windsor Locks, Connecticut. This was his first exposure to advanced technology, a shift in focus that would impact his subsequent research and career. He then spent four years aboard the USS Aspro, a Sturgeon-class nuclear submarine.

== Scholarship: tracing the nexus of scientific reasoning and literary symbolism ==
While in the Navy, Coblentz began working on a Master of Arts degree in English from San Francisco State University. His research was heavily influenced by his conversations with the inventor and philosopher Arthur M. Young at the Institute for the Study of Consciousness in Berkeley; ideas on gender and ethnicity put forward by Kim F. Hall, with whom Coblentz studied at Georgetown University; and studies of modernist and postmodernist literary criticism with Professor Geoffrey Green at SFSU. Coblentz's thesis explored parallels between the thought systems underlying subatomic physics and the postmodernist use of symbol. “Like the apocalyptic prophets of the death of literature,” Coblentz wrote, “some physicists have operated in hopes of bringing their work to a closure, speaking of a near future when, with the origins of the material universe explained and the last frontier conquered, physics will become a closed discipline.”

=== Science and symbolism in Renaissance England ===
Coblentz's research systematically traces the interplay between scientific reasoning and literary movements – particularly the use of symbol, myth, and language – from the mid-16th century to the present. He dissects the intersection of science, symbol, and public policy in this era, characterizing the “science of natural law” as a tool manipulated by the powerful: “The established symbolic order of things … took on the weight of divine utterance. Careful manipulation of symbol along archetypal lines allowed individuals and countries to embody the archetypes they invoked. Symbol, properly configured, reinforced the power of the queen; slightly realigned, it fortified King James I.”

=== Policy implications: gender, ethnicity, imperialism ===
To illustrate this assertion, Coblentz examines the symbolism and pseudo-science applied to the archetypal “Other” – particularly to blacks and women – as England entered the 17th century:

In the English Renaissance cosmology of “natural correspondences” and “self-evident truth,” white skin was superior to black just as day follows night; conveniently, the globe was constructed with Europe above and Africa below (and hell, presumably, below that)…. On the scale of gender, the disreputable qualities of changeability, insanity, and hysteria were virtues female in nature. Female disorderliness … was first evidenced by Eve’s illicit fit of munchies with the serpent in Eden …. Reason (and more broadly – as Baconian science expanded the definition – linear thinking, empirical objectivity, emotional passivity) was a province naturally male, and intuition (non-rational thought, “sixth” senses, and emotional involvement) more naturally feminine.

=== Modern science and technology: an inherited imbalance ===
Moving from the historical to the postmodern, Coblentz argues that similar irrational motivations continue to plague contemporary science, scientists, and science policy – irrationality traceable, in part, to an ongoing battle between science and religion or faith.

If God is one with Nature, but above man’s comprehension, then Nature is a mystery, and science will always be imperfect. If God has placed man over Nature, and objective investigation holds the key, then Nature is accessible, and science will eventually figure it out. It is as simple as that.

Coblentz argues that the Einstein-Bohr debates and the Copenhagen Interpretation were rooted in epistemology, not strictly physics or mathematics, and thus ultimately led to a search for new forms of language and expression.

This epistemological struggle is also, for the individual scientist, a psychological (even a Freudian) battleground – a threat to the scientist’s view of himself. The Einsteinian’s insistent refusal to accept Bohr’s ambiguities is an insistence born of panic – the panic of the dispassionate objectivist (who is neither dispassionate nor objective except by his inherited white male tradition) forced to face a Void (or, if you like, a Womb) he cannot penetrate, forced to accept truth without explanation, a ‘non-material’ ‘non-thing’ ‘non-inhabiting’ ‘non-space’ that nevertheless demands acknowledgement (notice that language necessarily breaks down; there are no words, and therefore no tools of discovery).

These theories – drawing on Coblentz's divergent early background in communication, psychology, and nuclear physics – became the lens through which he came to view advanced science and technology. They would increasingly shape his career and particularly his public policy contributions in areas ranging from sustainable development and nuclear non-proliferation to higher education, technology transfer, and entrepreneurship.

== Career ==
=== Nuclear Regulatory Commission ===
Upon exiting the Navy, Coblentz worked briefly at the Waterford Nuclear Generating Station in southern Louisiana, then became a health physics and engineering safety inspector for the U.S. Nuclear Regulatory Commission, primarily at West Coast nuclear facilities.

==== Public education on nuclear issues ====
Coblentz was asked to develop a specialized communications course for nuclear inspectors, and eventually headed a nationwide overhaul of the nuclear inspection reporting system. The resulting approach, as delineated in the NRC Inspection Manual Chapter 0610, (Note: http://pbadupws.nrc.gov/docs/ML0107/ML010750470.pdf) has been incorporated into multiple national nuclear regulatory frameworks. It was during this time that he developed close professional ties to E. Gail de Planque, the NRC Commissioner and former head of the Department of Energy's Environmental Measurements Laboratory, with whom Coblentz worked to improve the quality of public education on nuclear technology and transparency in nuclear activities.

==== Risk-informed, performance-based regulation ====
During Coblentz's tenure at the NRC, he worked on efforts to reform three additional policy areas: the protection of nuclear whistleblowers, the consistency of NRC enforcement actions (violations, civil penalties, and shutdown orders), and the formal incorporation of risk analysis into regulatory oversight and, subsequently, into nuclear power plant operation and maintenance. By this time, Coblentz's work had come to the attention of the new NRC Chairman, Shirley Ann Jackson, appointed by President Clinton in 1995, and he was working as Jackson's speechwriter and external relations adviser. A major challenge confronting the Commission was the counterproductive economic and safety impact of burdensome regulations that had accumulated over decades, coupled with continuing inconsistent safety performance at some nuclear facilities – which inevitably led to additional regulations. Under Jackson's leadership, Coblentz and his colleagues developed a methodology for incorporating risk into regulation, inspection, and enforcement. Jackson would come to call this “risk-informed, performance-based regulation.”

Following the 1979 nuclear accident at Three Mile Island, nuclear power plants had been required to conduct a comprehensive probabilistic risk assessment (PRA) of their facility, but these assessments had largely remained on the shelf, as no method had been devised of incorporating them formally into nuclear regulation, operation, or maintenance. The “risk-informed, performance-based” approach, while still emphasizing safety performance as the bottom line, provided a system for prioritizing regulatory inspection and enforcement – as well as rulemaking and licensing – in accordance with the relative degree of risk of the associated nuclear systems, structures, components, and activities. The goal was two-fold: to provide a defensible basis for regulatory oversight, and to encourage nuclear power plant operators to focus their greatest attention and resources in areas of greatest safety significance.

The change in approach required three elements: (1) an exhaustive analysis of the scenarios that could give rise to nuclear accidents (already accomplished for most plants via PRA); (2) the integration of risk analysis with public concerns, Congressional mandates, and other factors; (3) the designation of performance limits that, if adhered to, would acceptably protect against the identified risks.

==== International nuclear programs ====
Coblentz and an NRC colleague, Janice Dunn Lee, also supported Jackson in the development of the International Nuclear Regulators Association (INRA). Coblentz later became Jackson's adviser on the NRC's international programs, offering bilateral assistance to developing countries in the formulation of legal and regulatory frameworks, the installation of nuclear medical facilities, and safety and security at nuclear power plants. Coblentz worked with the regulators and operators of post-Soviet states to upgrade inspection and enforcement programs and associated communication protocols.

=== U.S. Senate Committee on Governmental Affairs ===
==== The e-Government Initiative ====
Shortly after Jackson completed her term as NRC Chairman, Coblentz was awarded a fellowship with the American Political Science Association. As part of the fellowship, he was selected by U.S. Senator Joseph Lieberman to work on “The e-Government Initiative” for the Senate Committee on Governmental Affairs, for which Lieberman was the ranking minority member. Coblentz designed and spearheaded the project with Kevin Landy, Lieberman's counsel on the Committee, negotiating with Senate rules officials to gain permission for this first-of-kind approach to use the Internet to engage citizens in online interaction, enabling direct public input in planning the electronic government legislation. For three months, members of the public were asked to comment on ways in which the federal government could deliver its services more efficiently and effectively via the Internet.

==== The E-Government Act of 2002 ====
Coblentz and Landy worked with Lieberman as well as with Senator Fred Thompson (the Committee Chairman) and his colleagues to distil the ideas into a coherent framework. Coblentz then prepared the initial draft legislation. By this time, Lieberman had been recruited by Vice President Al Gore as his running mate in the U.S. Presidential election; after the unsuccessful bid for the presidency, Lieberman introduced the legislation. The result was the E-Government Act of 2002, a transformative mandate for using information technology to improve the accessibility and cost-effectiveness of U.S. government services.

=== International Atomic Energy Agency ===
In August 2000, Coblentz moved to Vienna to become an international civil servant at the International Atomic Energy Agency (IAEA). At the IAEA, he was the speechwriter and communication adviser to Director General Mohamed ElBaradei. He contributed to pivotal policy decisions, such as: ElBaradei's push to revive the international nuclear fuel bank (envisioned in Eisenhower's original “Atoms for Peace” initiative), as first articulated in an article in The Economist in late 2003; ElBaradei's support for the 2006 U.S.-India deal to revive exchange of nuclear technology, which was heavily criticized by the traditional safeguards establishment but strongly pushed by the Bush administration; and a series of high-stakes nuclear nonproliferation crises in Iraq, Iran, Libya, and North Korea.

==== The Age of Deception ====
Coblentz has frequently drawn attention to the degree to which non-technological factors, ranging from cultural nuance to geopolitics, have contributed to nuclear crises. He collaborated with ElBaradei on The Age of Deception: Nuclear Diplomacy in Treacherous Times, a behind-the-scenes account of some of these crises, published by Henry Holt in 2011. The most eye-opening revelations in The Age of Deception, according to Coblentz, highlight “the degree to which political considerations by various governments trumped real avenues for diplomatic solutions.”

==== Iraq as a turning point for the IAEA ====
According to Coblentz, the nuclear inspections in Iraq represented a turning point for ElBaradei and the IAEA. On the day that the IAEA was asked by the U.S. to pull its inspectors out of Iraq, in advance of the March 2003 bombing, ElBaradei altered the draft of a speech he was about to deliver to the IAEA Board of Governors, adding a quote from Adlai Stevenson: “There is no evil in the atom; only in men’s souls.” Coblentz noted that:

Finding many of the allegations, the points on which the U.S. and the U.K. were making their case, to be inaccurate, it seemed very clear to [ElBaradei] that he was building the case for why there was … no imminent threat. And to have that overridden … was a real turning point. His backbone had always been very stiff; but I think this was the occasion on which he basically said, “Never again on my watch.”

==== The 2005 Nobel Peace Prize ====
In 2005, the IAEA and its Director-General were awarded the Nobel Peace Prize. Coblentz has described working with ElBaradei on the Nobel speech:

Everything that you have seen and worked for over the past 30 years – how do you compress that into 20 minutes? What is really the message you want to send [to a global audience]? And we came back to the Iraq War because he had begun to think that the two twin themes of the UN, security and development, really were a single theme. … We were sitting in his office and [ElBaradei] said … “What the Iraq War should have taught us is that security and development are inextricably intertwined.” Where you have poverty and abrogation of human rights, you also often have inept governance, you have a circumstance in which people, as they see the inequity, and are not allowed to express their views, the result is a natural situation for fomenting not only humiliation and injustice but anger, and a sense of wanting to redress wrongs. So from that you have violence of multiple sorts: you have civil strife; you have a breeding ground for extremism; and ultimately, if the seeds are sown deeply enough, that is where we are seeing the pursuit of weapons of mass destruction.

==== Importance of values in a technology context ====
Speaking about the ongoing tension over Iran's nuclear program, Coblentz has noted the ways in which miscommunication, disrespect, and a lack of cultural understanding have compounded the standoff between Iran and the West. As an IAEA spokesperson, he repeated ElBaradei's mantra that Iran needed to address a “confidence deficit” with the international community. “What we would hope for is that Iran and other parties would be able to engage in a dialogue that would restore trust.” Coblentz has continued to emphasize the complexity of the dilemma facing ElBaradei and his successor, Yukiya Amano, when dealing with unverified allegations about Iran's nuclear program.

Coblentz has appeared as an IAEA nuclear safety expert in The Nuclear Option, a documentary film focused on the capacity of nuclear power as a source of sustainable, non-greenhouse gas emitting energy.

=== Rensselaer Polytechnic Institute ===
While at the IAEA, Coblentz continued to collaborate with his former boss, Shirley Ann Jackson, on science policy concepts and speeches. During Jackson's tenure as president of the American Association for the Advancement of Science, for example, she had worked with Coblentz on the theme of the “Nexus of Science and Society,” tracing the historical development of science policy and the role of scientists as authoritative sources in society. In late 2007, Coblentz left the IAEA to work with Jackson again as Chief of Staff and Associate Vice President of Policy and Planning at Rensselaer Polytechnic Institute (RPI), a research university in upstate New York where Jackson was the university president.

==== EMPAC ====
Under Jackson, Coblentz led the launch of RPI's $220 million Experimental Media and Performing Arts Center (EMPAC). Coblentz developed a close professional relationship with Johannes Goebel, the Director of EMPAC, whose expertise at the nexus of science, technology, and the arts was embodied in the EMPAC academic mission as well as in its physical design. With its acoustics and capabilities for creating immersive human-scale multisensory environments, EMPAC lays claim to being three buildings in one: a performance venue for time-based arts, an educational facility, and a first-of-kind research laboratory.

==== Technology Commercialization and Entrepreneurship ====
Jackson also asked Coblentz to oversee a trio of RPI operations focused on intellectual property protection and technology transfer: the Rensselaer Incubator, the Office of Technology Commercialization, and the 1250-acre Rensselaer Technology Park. Coblentz created the Innovation and Entrepreneurship Council to bring coherence to university wide tech transfer operations, and revamped the RPI incubation approach, launching the Emerging Ventures Ecosystem (EVE) (Note: http://.rpihub.org/eve-portal) in February 2011.

==== Departure From RPI ====
Coblentz left RPI in September 2011 without public explanation, leading to speculation on the reasons for his departure. The Albany Times Union suggested that he had been “forced out for questioning Jackson’s leadership.”

=== Entrepreneurship: technology to address global challenges ===
On leaving RPI, Coblentz began working on a number of start-up ventures. Make It Private, LLC, based in Plano, Texas, builds on advances in the control of digital information, using tokenization to protect consumer privacy (including the prescriptive requirements of the EU Data Directive), and to enable data security in the cloud. He became an outspoken advocate for online privacy, telling a TEDx audience, "The technology that we all rely on is turning each one of us into a commodity... Technology, when it is applied with innovation and a sense of ethics, can actually turn you back into a human, give you back your rights."

In 2012, Coblentz founded the Tech Valley Center of Gravity (CoG), a New York not-for-profit focused explicitly on the retention and growth of post-university professionals in New York's Capital District. (Note: https://www.tvcog.net) With the support of a local group of inventors and entrepreneurs, Coblentz transformed an abandoned 5000 square-foot off-track betting facility into a MakerSpace, a member-governed "idea factory" outfitted for metalworking, woodworking, 3D printing, optics, biotech, robotics, electronics, welding, and textile work. The CoG welcomed artists, engineers, scientists, and "creators" from any discipline. It has experienced rapid growth in its first two years, acquiring more than 200 members and serving nearly 50 companies, and experiencing substantial support from municipal and State government agencies, private sector donors, academic institutions, and local NGOs.

In June 2013, Coblentz and the Center of Gravity were recognized by New York's Center for Economic Growth (CEG) with their 2013 Technology Innovation Award.

In 2014, based in part on a $550,000 grant from the Empire State Development Corporation, Coblentz and the Center of Gravity launched a $4 million renovation of the Quackenbush, a long-vacant Victorian-era building in the heart of downtown Troy. In January 2015, the Quackenbush was approved for Start-Up New York designation with Hudson Valley Community College. On August 19, 2015, New York Governor Cuomo announced the opening of the new facility, characterizing the Center of Gravity as playing “a vital role in helping the Capital Region’s tech industry flourish.” In less than four years, the Center of Gravity had grown to support a broad range of companies, most focused on high-tech innovation, such as “a 3D printer manufacturer, a team of RPI grads making bacteria-killing light fixtures, and a company designing aquaponics systems for the Caribbean island of Dominica.” The Quackenbush would provide a new home for many of those companies.

=== Involvement in Egyptian Revolution ===
Coblentz continued to work closely with his former boss, Mohamed ElBaradei, during his time at RPI. In addition to collaboration on The Age of Deception, Coblentz assisted ElBaradei on op-eds and articles criticizing the Mubarak regime in Egypt. During the early days of the Egyptian Revolution, Coblentz and other IAEA colleagues of ElBaradei contradicted the notion that ElBaradei had only recently become engaged in Egyptian politics, saying he had never relinquished his focus on human rights deficiencies in his home country. Coblentz noted that ElBaradei had first confronted Mubarak in early 2003, during the lead-up to the Iraq War, as well as on subsequent encounters.

Coblentz pointed out the role that social media played in convincing ElBaradei that the young people of Egypt were ready for change: “It was really this last 14 months, where someone I knew as not being particularly computer savvy, taught himself to use Facebook and Twitter and YouTube and started to do in virtual space what was forbidden to do by the Mubarak regime, the freedom of assembly by large groups.”

=== ITER: harnessing fusion energy ===
In September 2015, Coblentz took a new position as head of communication at ITER, a nuclear fusion research facility in Saint-Paul-lez-Durance, France. (Note: www.iter.org) ITER is an international research project intended to demonstrate the production of energy from a self-heating, or “burning,” plasma and to advance research into fusion energy.

Fusion, the mass-to-energy conversion created by the high-speed collision of atomic nuclei, is the engine that powers the sun and stars. As Coblentz said to CNN, “What we’re really doing here [at ITER] is trying to build a star on Earth.” The technological approach, known as magnetic confinement fusion, has been demonstrated in hundreds of experimental machines over the past six decades, usually in the form of a tokamak or a stellarator. By constructing and demonstrating a full-scale facility, the ITER Tokamak will, as Coblentz puts it, “make the C.A.S.E. for fusion” as a Clean (carbon-free, minimal waste), Abundant (millions of years of fuel), Safe (inherently safe physics, no possibility of meltdown), and Economic (competitive cost per kilowatt-hour; elimination of the costs of conflict and competition that go with a petroleum-based energy economy) source of energy.

The ITER machine is extraordinarily complex, designed to comprise more than 1 million components. This complexity is compounded further by the intricate funding and in-kind contribution of those components by the seven ITER Members – China, India, Japan, Korea, Russia, the United States, and the European Union – under the 2006 ITER Agreement. The benefit of this arrangement is that the major powers pool their best expertise, share the costs, and receive equal access to the intellectual property and technology spin-offs, much like CERN. The challenge, on the other hand, is managing such an arrangement. The ITER project encountered management shortcomings, cost overruns and delays and a sharply critical 2013 audit, leaked to Raffi Katchadourian at The New Yorker, called for urgent reform.

Coblentz was hired by the new ITER Director-General, Bernard Bigot, as part of a senior management team brought in to get the project back on track. Comprehensive reform included integration of the ITER Organization with its Domestic Agencies, more effective decision-making and communication, exhaustive reassessment of the construction and assembly schedule and associated costs, finalization of major component design, and creation of a project culture applying the best principles of risk management and systems engineering.

By mid-2016, project critics were becoming cautiously optimistic, noting the rejuvenated pace of ITER construction onsite and component manufacturing worldwide. Additional countries were expressing interest in joining the newly revitalized project, including Iran – which, as Coblentz noted to the Associated Press, highlighted the exclusively peaceful nature of ITER and magnetic confinement fusion. ITER went on to sign cooperation agreement with Kazakhstan in 2017 and Canada in 2020. After the United Kingdom left Euratom in 2021, which undermined its role at ITER, Coblentz spoke about a "path forward" for the UK to participate more fully in the project once again.

After the death of Bernard Bigot in May 2022, Coblentz continued to serve as Director of Communication under the newly appointed ITER Director General, Pietro Barabaschi.

Although progress continued on ITER with the start machine assembly in July 2020, the project was hindered by supply-chain delays related to the COVID-19 pandemic and the discovery of cracks in the piping system for cooling the thermal shields. This led to billions being added to the project budget and a revised timeline that delays first plasma operations until 2034.

During his time at ITER, Coblentz has worked to position fusion energy within the climate change debate, hosting the Fusion and Climate round table at the COP28 international climate meetings in Dubai in December 2023. Coblentz sees ITER as not just a step on the path to clean energy, but also a key source of energy for coping with the effects of climate change. He told journalists in 2024 that fusion energy would be essential, "If we really have sea level rise to the extent that we start to need the energy consumption to move cities."

Coblentz participated in the making of the 2017 documentary about fusion energy and the ITER project, Let There Be Light.

== Personal ==
Coblentz currently resides in Aix-en-Provence, France with his wife and daughter. He has continued to write plays, including Charades and The Oedipus Experiment.
