= Ruth Paine Home =

Historic house in Texas, United States

- Paine House
- U.S. National Register of Historic Places
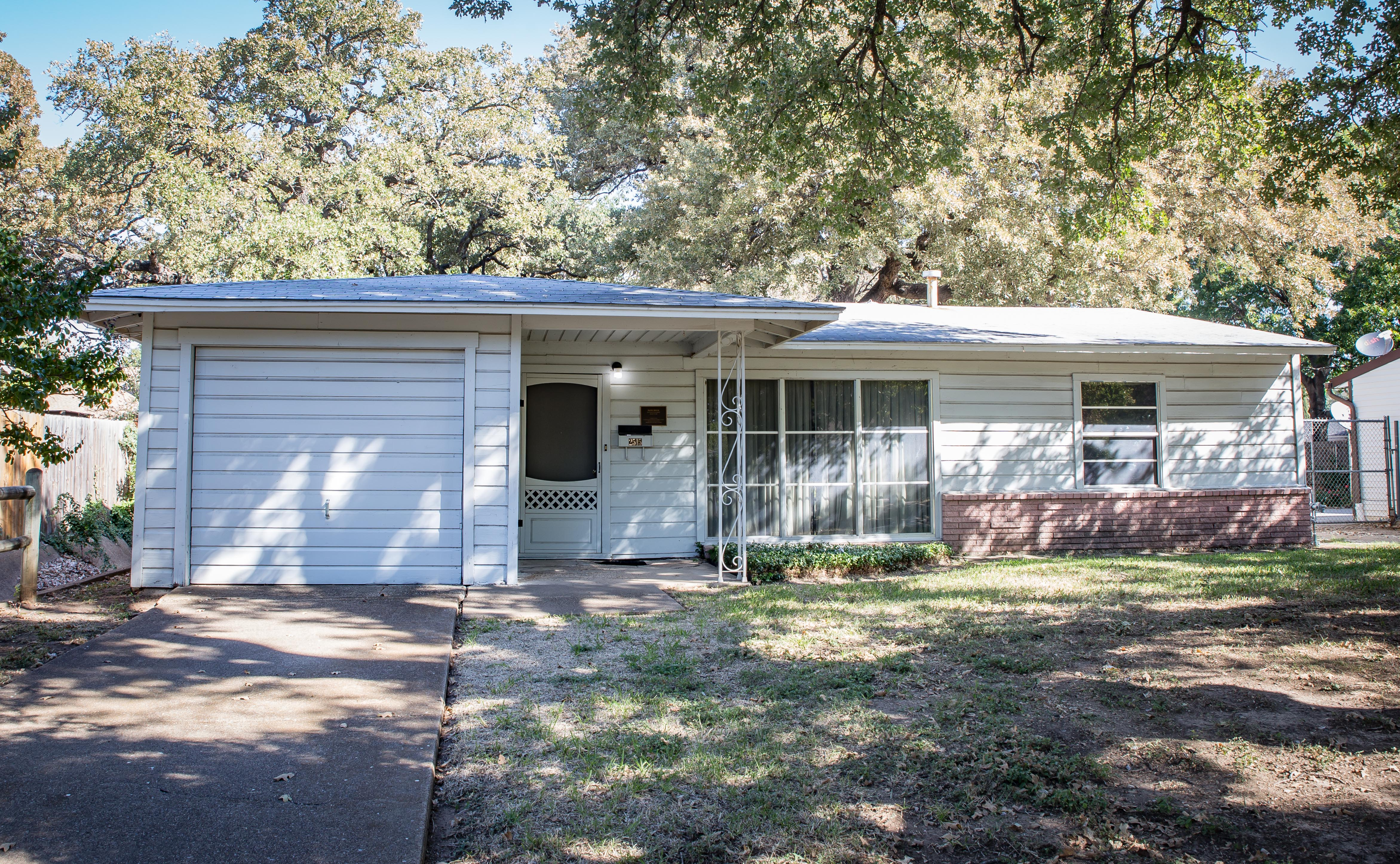
- Paine House in 2022

- Location within Texas Location within the United States
- Location: 2515 W. Fifth Street, Irving, Texas
- Coordinates: 32°48′35″N 96°58′45″W
- Area: 0.20 acres (0.081 ha)
- Built: 1956; 70 years ago
- Built by: C.B. Hardee
- Architectural style: Modern Movement: Ranch Style
- NRHP reference No.: 14000963
- Added to NRHP: November 26, 2014

The Ruth Paine Home at 2515 W. 5th Street in Irving, Texas, United States, is the location where Ruth Paine housed Lee Harvey Oswald's wife, Marina Oswald, for several months until the day after the assassination of President John F. Kennedy. According to official government investigations, including the Warren Commission, it was from the house's garage that Oswald removed the rifle used to shoot Kennedy, having previously concealed it there.

The house was placed on the National Register of Historic Places (NRHP) in November 2014.

== History ==
Located in the Dallas suburb of Irving, the Paine home was built in 1956. It was a key location in the John F. Kennedy assassination saga of 1963. The house, owned at the time by Michael and Ruth Paine, served as a temporary residence for Marina Oswald and her children. The Paines were separated and living apart, so Ruth had offered her home to Marina.

According to official investigations, Marina's husband, Lee Harvey Oswald, was living about 13 miles (21 km) away at a rooming house at 1026 N. Beckley in Dallas to be near his newly acquired job at the Texas School Book Depository in Downtown Dallas. Oswald visited Marina and the children customarily on Fridays and spent the weekend at the Paine home, then returned again to Dallas for work on Monday.

After his shift on Thursday, November 21, 1963, Oswald asked co-worker Buell Wesley Frazier for a ride back to Irving on Thursday instead of the following day. Frazier, a nearby neighbor of the Paines, also worked at the Texas School Book Depository, and he and Oswald commuted together daily to Downtown Dallas. Lee stated that Marina had made him some new curtains for his apartment and he wanted to retrieve them.

On the morning of November 22, 1963, Oswald is said to have retrieved his rifle from the garage, where it was concealed in a blanket on the garage floor. Leaving early before anyone was awake, and leaving cash and his wedding ring on a bedside table, Oswald reportedly then wrapped the rifle in some bulk brown wrapping paper and proceeded a half block to the home where Frazier stayed. He placed the package in the back seat and began the commute to the Texas School Book Depository.

In 2009, the city of Irving purchased the property and began plans to restore the home. In an effort to return the home to its 1963 appearance, the city spent an estimated $100,000. Restoration began in 2011, and the Ruth Paine Home was opened as a museum on November 6, 2013.

The museum neither encourages nor discourages the idea of conspiracy theories.

== Gallery ==
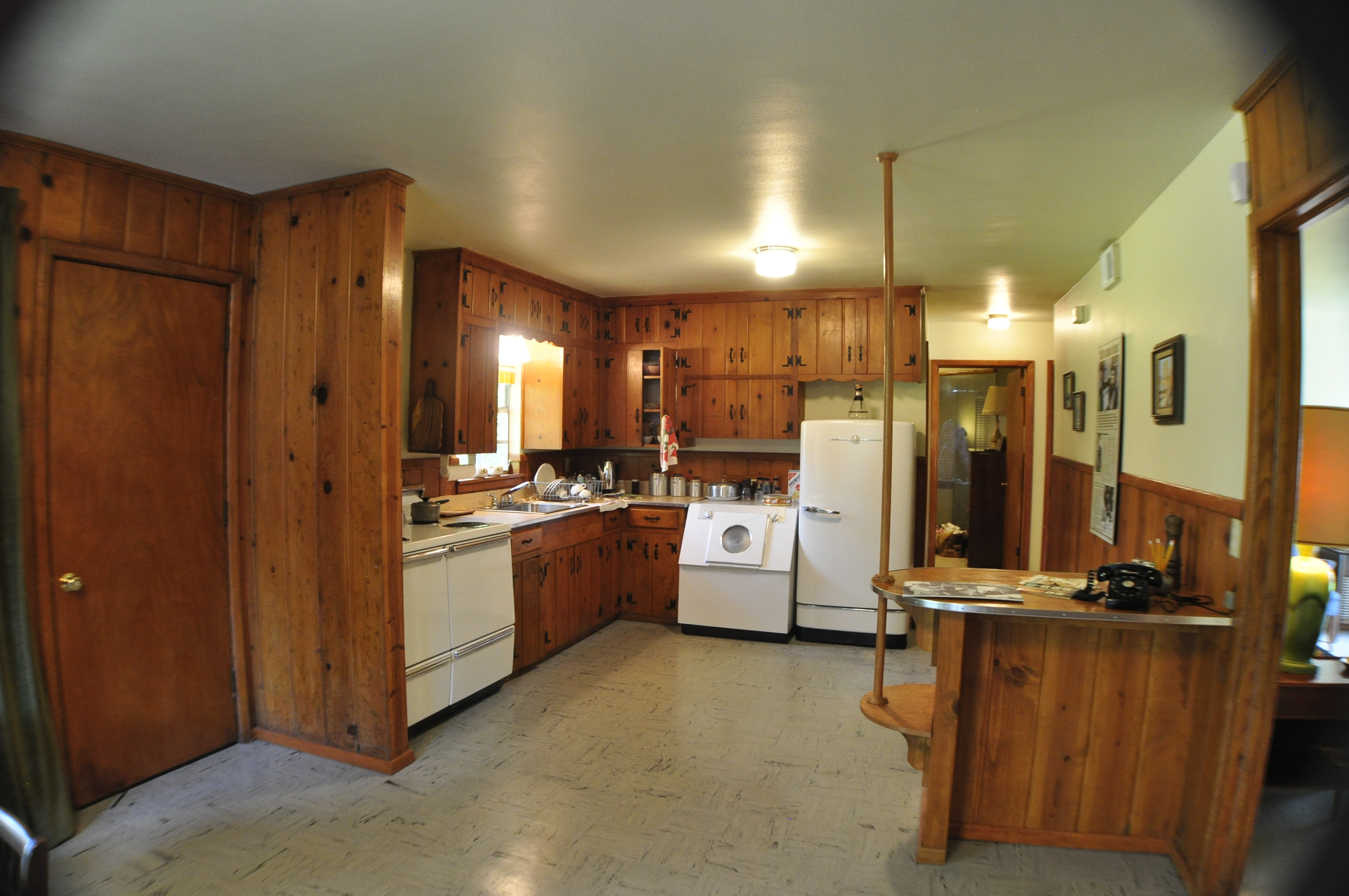
Kitchen

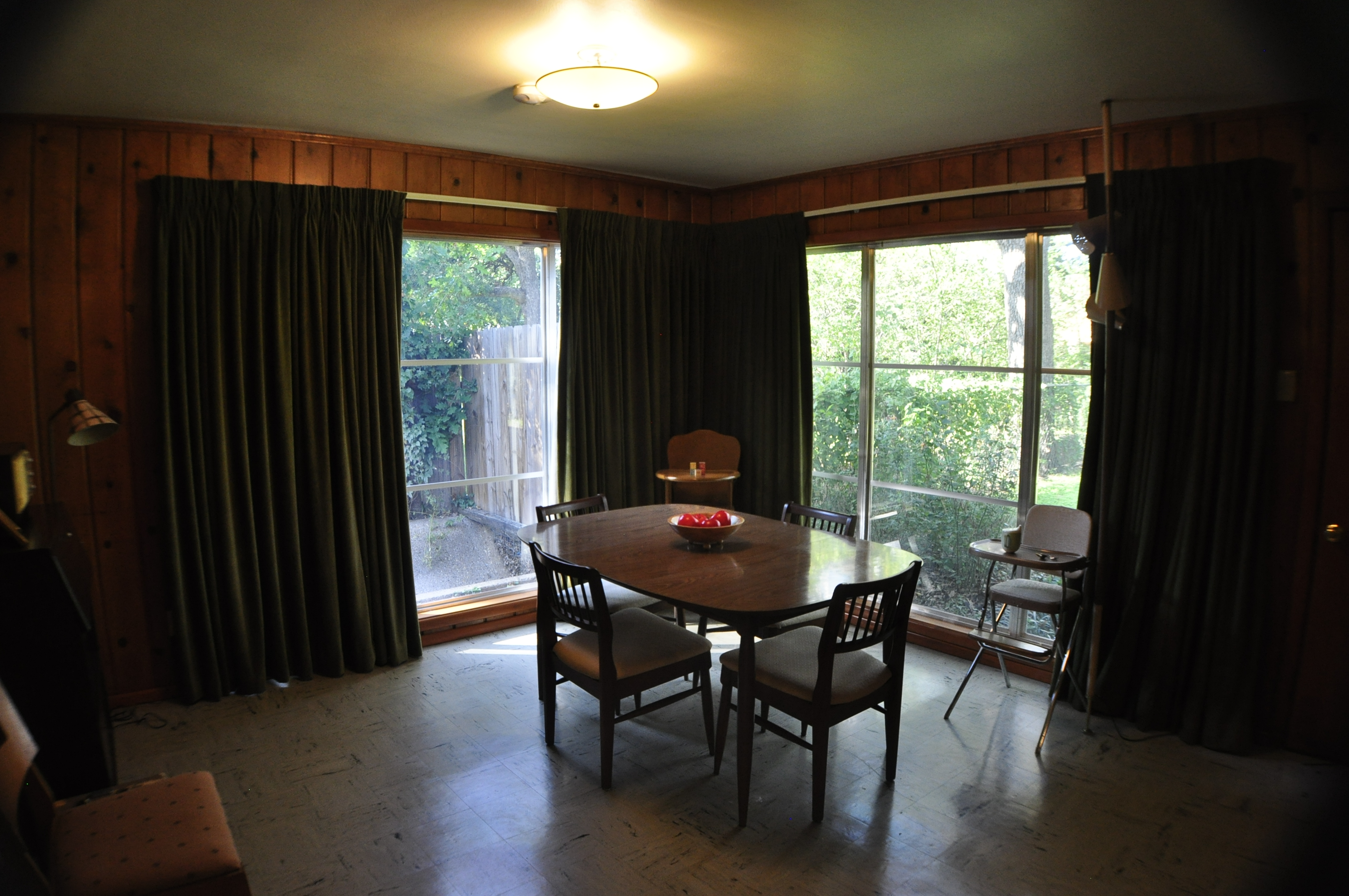
Breakfast Nook

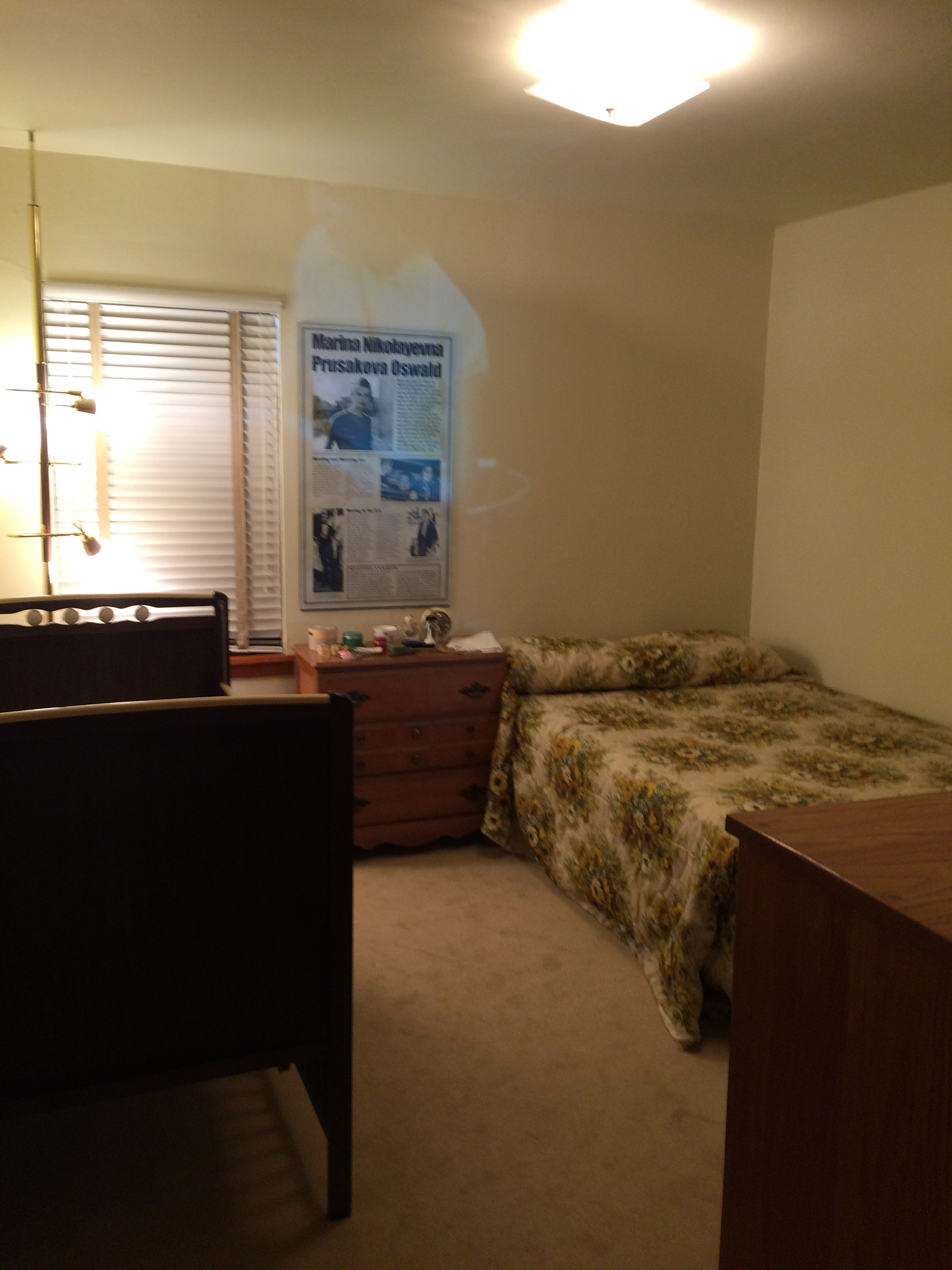
Marina Oswald (Guest) Room

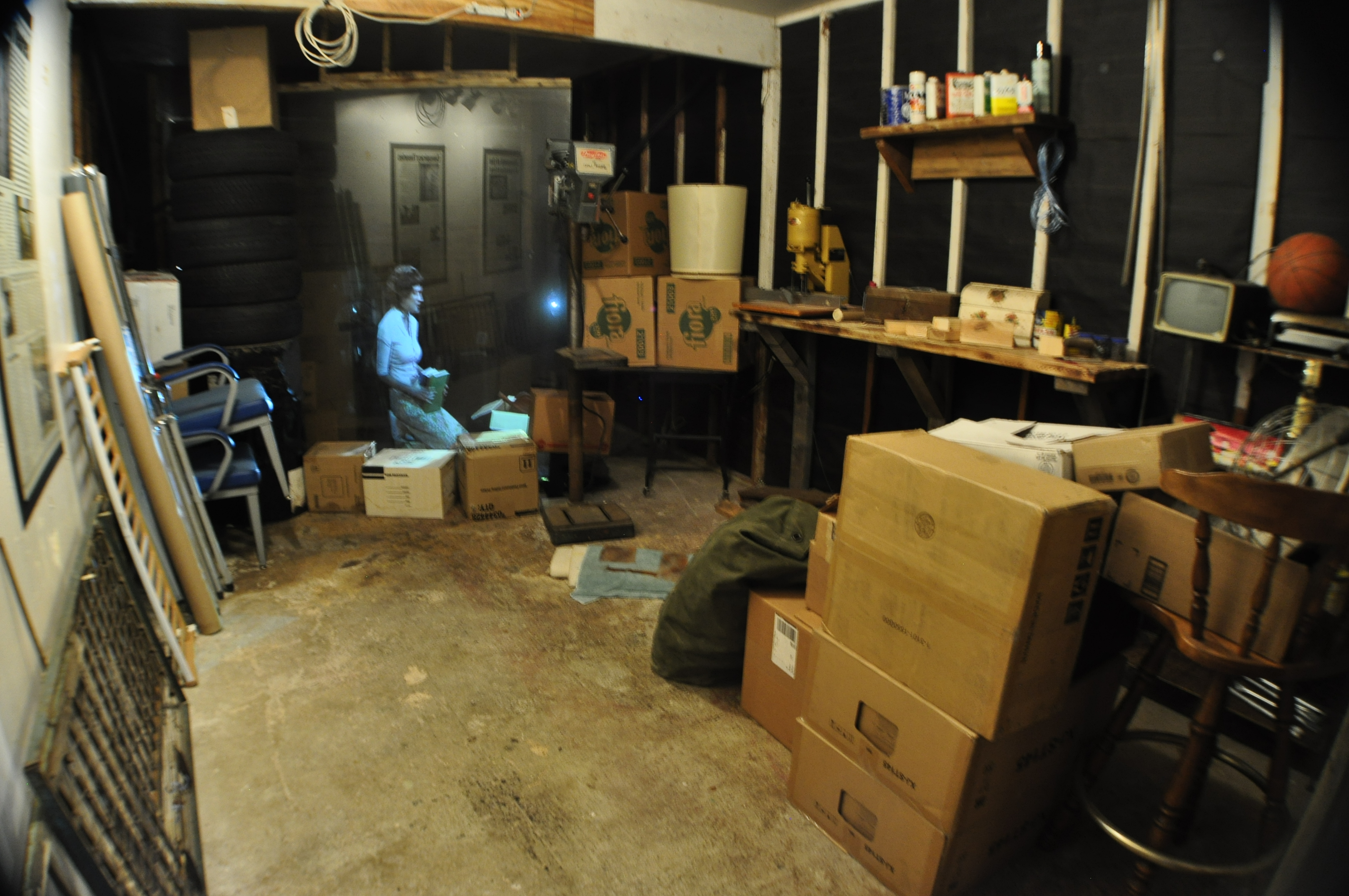
Garage

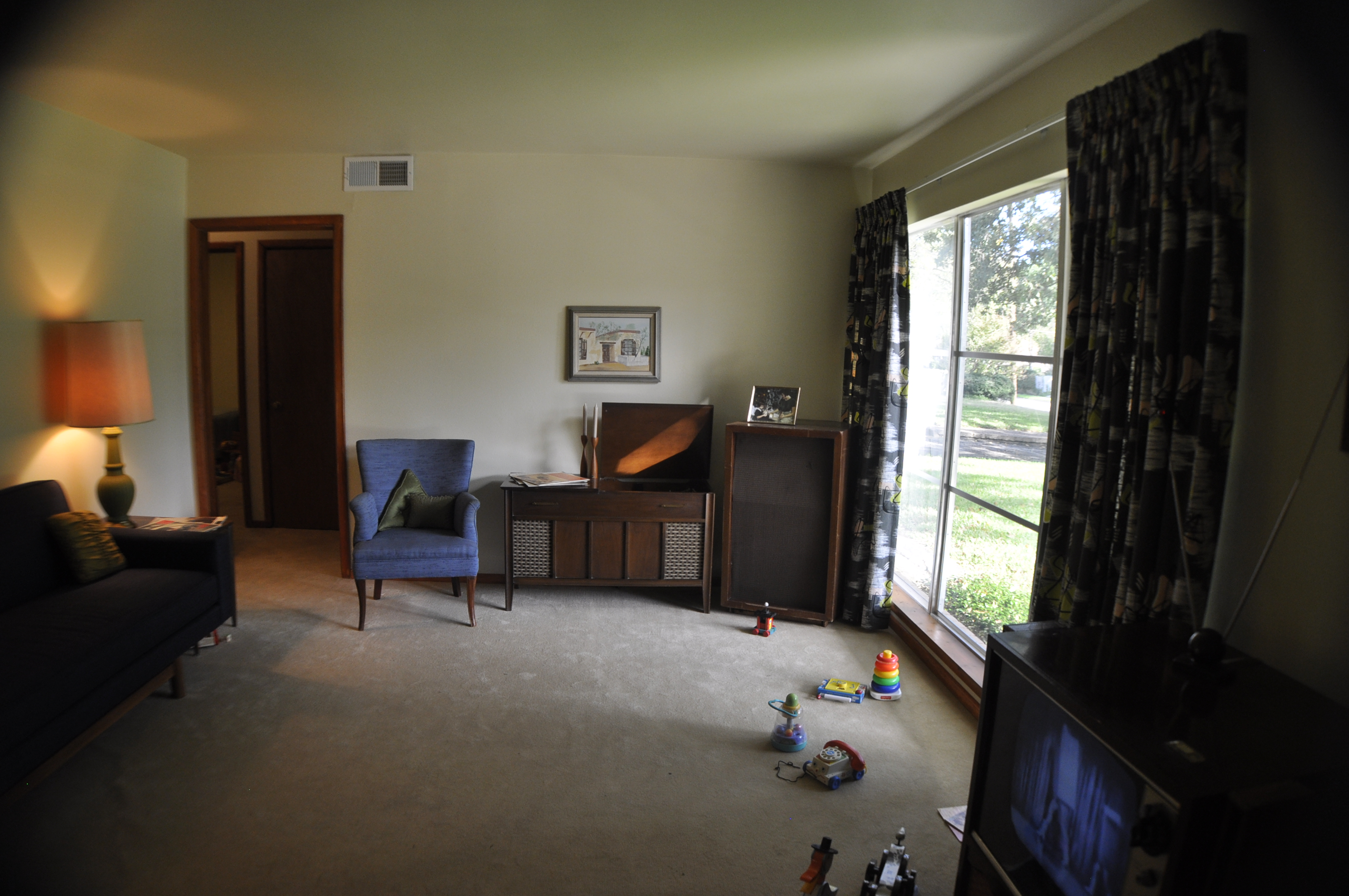
Living Room

== See also ==
- National Register of Historic Places listings in Dallas County, Texas
