= Ruth Forbes Young =

American philanthropist & painter

- Born: October 4, 1903; Milton, Massachusetts
- Died: March 3, 1998 (aged 94); Berkeley, California
- Spouses: Lyman Paine (m. 1926; div. 1934): Dr. Giles Thomas; Arthur M. Young
- Children: 2, including Michael
- Parent(s): Ralph Emerson Forbes; Elise Cabot
- Relatives: Forbes family

Ruth Forbes Young (October 4, 1903 – March 3, 1998) was a member of the Forbes family and a founder of the International Peace Academy in 1970. She also co-founded Berkeley's Institute for the Study of Consciousness with her third husband, Arthur M. Young.

== Background and family life ==
Forbes was a member of the Massachusetts Forbes family, being the daughter of Ralph Emerson Forbes and Elise Cabot. She was a great-granddaughter of Ralph Waldo Emerson and a niece of William Cameron Forbes (Governor-General of the Philippines 1908 - 1913).

Forbes married architect Lyman Paine in the mid-1920s; they moved together from Boston to New York, where Forbes' friend Mary Bancroft described them as hosting "wonderful parties in their West Side apartment". Forbes and Paine divorced in the 1930s after having two children, Cameron Paine and Michael Paine. A second marriage, in the early 1940s to Dr. Giles Thomas, was cut short by the latter's death. Forbes married Arthur M. Young in 1948.

== Career ==
Forbes studied painting at the Arts Student League, and her still lifes and landscapes were exhibited in New York and Philadelphia. She produced ballets in Santa Barbara, designing sets and costumes herself.

Forbes joined the World Federalist Movement after the dropping of atomic bombs in 1945. Later wanting to go beyond this, she consulted with United Nations Secretary-General U Thant about setting up an international academy to support international diplomatic efforts towards peace. Thant recommended getting in touch with Indar Jit Rikhye, who went on to become the International Peace Academy first President. Forbes provided the academy's initial funding, and continued to support it financially. In 1972 Forbes also co-founded Berkeley's Institute for the Study of Consciousness with her third husband, Arthur M. Young.
