= Liberation (magazine) =

American monthly magazine (1956–1977)

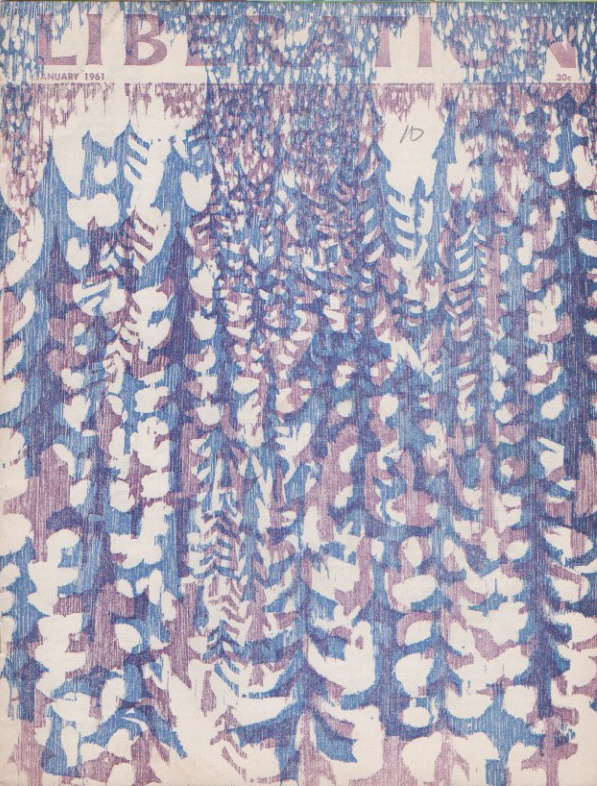
- First issue: April 1956; 70 years ago
- Final issue: 1977; 49 years ago
- Based in: New York City, New York, U.S.
- Language: English
- ISSN: 0024-189X
- OCLC: 856110

Liberation was a radical pacifist magazine published from 1956 to 1977 in the United States. A bimonthly and later a monthly, it aligned itself with the 1960s New Left.

== History ==
Liberation: An Independent Monthly was founded, edited and published by David Dellinger, Bayard Rustin, Sidney Lens, Roy Finch, and A. J. Muste out of New York City and from a small anarchist community in Glen Gardner, New Jersey where Dellinger lived. In the first issue, which appeared in April 1956, the editors included a kind of mission statement titled "Tract for the Times"; it concluded with this paragraph:

Liberation will seek to inspire its readers not only to fresh thinking but to action now—refusal to run away or to conform, concrete resistance in the communities in which we live to all the ways in which human beings are regimented and corrupted, dehumanized and deprived of their freedom; experimentation in creative living by individuals, families, and groups; day to day support of movements to abolish colonialism and racism or for the freedom of all individuals from domination, whether military, economic, political, or cultural.

Muste brought funding from the War Resisters League. For Rustin, Liberation represented a major commitment of his time and energy as he worked to raise money and also was meeting regularly with Muste. Rustin contacted Martin Luther King Jr. to encourage him to write for the magazine. The June 1963 issue contained King's "Letter from Birmingham Jail", the first time it was printed in its entirety and under that title.

The magazine's editorial positions were comparable to those of Studies on the Left. Dellinger backed the 1959 Cuban Revolution (which caused a rift at the magazine and resulted in Roy Finch resigning as an editor) and later published articles sympathetic to the Castro regime. The magazine supported Students for a Democratic Society and opposed the Vietnam War.

Liberation provided assistance to Fellowship of Reconciliation (FoR) organizers, and the magazine's editorial offices at times served as a clearinghouse for activists conducting non-violent resistance.

Liberation occasionally ran investigative journalist pieces. In early 1965, it printed two long articles by Vincent Salandria challenging the Warren Commission's findings on the JFK assassination. In 1975, the magazine published an exposé by Fred Landis, which accused the CIA of waging psychological warfare against Chile prior to the 1973 coup d'état.

A poem by Louis Ginsberg, father of Allen Ginsberg, was published in Liberation. Children's book author Vera Williams created the artwork for many of the covers.

By 1977, Dellinger had moved on to launch a new magazine called Seven Days. Liberation was being edited by Jan Edwards and Michael Nill out of Cambridge, Massachusetts, but it ceased publication not long after Dellinger's departure.

== Legacy ==
Liberation, together with Dissent, anticipated changes in the 1950s-60s American political left, such as the early civil rights movement and the use of nonviolent protest.

In 1965, Paul Goodman edited an anthology, Seeds of Liberation, that included a selection of editorials, articles, poems, and reviews from the magazine's first decade. In his Preface, Goodman noted how often the magazine had been prescient about trends, social movements, etc., stating at one point that "the 'news' has been catching up to Liberation".

== Bibliography ==
- Avrich, Paul (1995). Anarchist Voices: An Oral History of Anarchism in America. Princeton: Princeton University Press. ISBN 978-0691034126. OCLC 68772773.
- Hunt, Andrew E. (2006). David Dellinger: The Life and Times of a Nonviolent Revolutionary. New York: NYU Press. ISBN 978-0814736388.
- Unger, Irwin (1974). The Movement: A History of the American New Left, 1959-1972. New York: Harper and Row. ISBN 978-0060467265.
