= Alan Tonelson =

American economist

Alan Tonelson (born 1953) is an American research fellow at the U.S. Business and Industry Council Educational Foundation. He has written extensively on the trade deficit between the United States and other countries. He has also written on free trade, globalization and industrial decline. He argues that U.S. economic policy should aim for "preeminence" over other countries, just as, he believes, other countries' economic policies seek their own national interests. He is critical of various forms of globalism and internationalism.

He earned a Bachelor of Arts in History at Princeton University. He has no formal training in economics and has never published a paper in a peer-reviewed economics journal. In 2002 he became a fellow at the Henry L. Stimson Center.

He has also worked as an associate editor of the Foreign Policy journal and Fellow at the Economic Strategy Institute. He has appeared also on radio and television broadcasts, such as the PBS NewsHour and Nightly Business Report.

== Bibliography ==
=== Books ===
- The Race to the Bottom: Why a Worldwide Worker Surplus and Uncontrolled Free Trade are Sinking American Living Standards, Basic Books, 2002.

as co-author:

- with Clyde V. Prestowitz and Ronald A. Morse, Powernomics, Madison Books, 1991.

=== Articles ===
- "Notebook: Up from globalism". Harper's. Vol. 320, no. 1916. Jan 2010. pp. 7–9.
