= Ruth Paine =

American teacher and acquaintance of Marina Oswald (1932–2025)

Ruth Hyde Paine
- Born: Ruth Avery Hyde; September 3, 1932; New York City, U.S.
- Died: August 31, 2025 (aged 92); Santa Rosa, California, U.S.
- Education: Antioch College; University of South Florida
- Occupation: Educator
- Known for: Acquaintance with Marina Oswald and Lee Harvey Oswald; Ruth Paine Home
- Spouse: Michael Paine (m. 1957; div. 1970)

Ruth Hyde Paine (born Ruth Avery Hyde; September 3, 1932 – August 31, 2025) was an American teacher who became notable after the assassination of President John F. Kennedy, as she housed Lee Harvey Oswald's wife, Marina Oswald, in her home for several months until the day after the assassination. According to official government investigations, including the Warren Commission, Lee Oswald stored the 6.5 mm caliber Carcano rifle used to shoot U.S. President John F. Kennedy in Ruth Paine's garage, unbeknownst to her and her husband, Michael Paine. Supporters of the Warren Commission have generally had a positive view of the Paines, but various conspiracy theorists have speculated that they may have had an ulterior motive.

== Early life ==
Paine was born Ruth Avery Hyde in New York City on September 3, 1932, to William A. and Carol E. Hyde. Her father was an employee of the U.S. Agency for International Development. She went to Antioch College in Ohio and became a Quaker. She met her future husband Michael Paine through her interest in folk dancing and music. Though not a Quaker himself, Michael attended meetings with Ruth. They married on December 28, 1957.

In 1959 Michael Paine got a job with Bell Helicopter in Fort Worth, Texas, 30 miles from Dallas, and the Paines moved into a house in the suburb of Irving (Michael Paine's step-father, Arthur M. Young, designed the first Bell Helicopter). As liberals in Dallas, the Paines were isolated, and Ruth Paine was quite lonely. Around September 1962, with help from her divorce attorney, Louise Raggio, Ruth Paine separated from her husband Michael, due to what was described as “unkind, cruel, harsh and tyrannical treatment and conduct” by him beginning about six months prior to their separation.

Ruth Paine had been studying Russian since 1957. In the late 1950s, she participated in the East-West Contact Committee, which sponsored visits by three Soviets to the US. She was also involved in a pen pal program between Quakers and the Committee of the Soviet Youth Organizations. In 1963 she signed up to teach a summer class in Russian at St. Mark's School in Dallas, but only one student signed up, the future actor William Hootkins.

Ruth Paine met the Oswalds through her interest in the Russian language. She had learned to read Russian but needed help with conversational Russian. Also, she and Michael Paine were separated at this time. A mutual friend from their Madrigal singing group, Everett Glover, invited her to a party at his apartment on February 22, 1963, because he thought she would be interested in meeting two interesting people who spoke Russian.

The attendance of the couple, Lee and Marina Oswald, was arranged by Oswald's friend, 51-year-old White Russian émigré aristocrat George de Mohrenschildt, a well-educated petroleum geologist with intelligence connections.

== John F. Kennedy assassination ==
=== Involvement with Oswald family ===
Ruth Paine drove Marina Oswald to New Orleans when the Oswalds moved there in May 1963 and back to Dallas when they moved again in September 1963. When the Oswalds resettled in the Dallas area, Lee stayed in a boarding house under the name O.H. Lee, while Marina and their child, June, moved in with Ruth Paine in the suburb of Irving, Texas. The second Oswald child was born thereafter. Marina helped with the housework and Ruth's Russian studies while Lee visited on weekends. Michael and Ruth had long been separated, but remained on good terms. Michael was a frequent visitor and cared for his children. At the suggestion of a neighbor, Linnie Mae Randle, Ruth Paine told Lee Oswald about a job opportunity at the Texas School Book Depository. Ruth Paine testified that Lee had given Marina $10 to buy herself some shoes and that they had planned on going shopping for them on the afternoon of November 22. The arrival of police at the house stopped that from happening.

According to the Warren Commission, Lee Harvey Oswald stayed at the Paine home with Marina and his children unannounced on Thursday night, November 21, 1963—the night before President Kennedy was assassinated. When Oswald left for work on the morning of November 22, he brought a large package that he had kept in the Paines' garage with him to work at the Texas School Book Depository. Oswald's coworker and friend, Wesley Frazier, testified that Oswald told him the bag contained curtain rods. The Commission concluded that the package contained the rifle used to shoot President Kennedy. Deputy Sheriff Roger Craig stated that after the assassination, he saw a man, who he later thought was Oswald, enter a green Rambler station wagon on the street driven by a "Latin-looking" man. Oswald later said "That station wagon belongs to Mrs. Paine. Don't try to tie her into this."

Eight days after the assassination of President Kennedy, on November 30, 1963, Ruth Paine inadvertently discovered evidence possibly linking him to an attempted assassination of General Edwin Walker. Among the letters that Ruth Paine reportedly sent to Marina was a thick book of household advice in Russian. The book contained an undated note left by Lee for Marina on April 10, 1963 (the day of the Walker assassination attempt) that Marina later testified she had concealed. Before the Kennedy assassination, Dallas police had no suspects in the Walker shooting.

== Later life ==
=== Aftermath ===
Ruth Paine testified before the Warren Commission. She was asked 5,000 questions by the commission, far more than the average question tally per witness of 300 questions. She said she would not use the word "mister" as it was "contrary to Quaker practice" though she later called Guy Mamantov "Mr. Mamantov". She described an "Impression of the Impression" routine, with Michael and Lee Oswald: "It has to be my impression of his impressions. I don't recall the evening too well, the evening of the second. I do recall we certainly had dinner together. I can't recall what the predominant language was. Lee and Michael, of course, talked in English. Not wanting to exclude her entirely from the conversation, I made opportunity to talk with her in Russian after the meal was over. She and I did the dishes and talked in Russian, and we were in the kitchen while Michael was talking to Lee in English in the living room, so I do not know what was said then between the two of them."

Paine also testified in the trial of Clay Shaw. In 1978, Paine received a telephone call from investigators with the House Select Committee on Assassinations (HSCA), which had been set up to reinvestigate the murder of President Kennedy. However she was never requested to testify by the committee. She testified at a 1986 televised mock trial of Lee Harvey Oswald organised by Vincent Bugliosi.

After the assassination, Marina and Lee Oswald's mother, Marguerite, briefly stayed with Ruth Paine until Marina was taken into custody by the Secret Service. Marguerite and Lee's brother Robert did not like Ruth Paine, which may have influenced Marina Oswald. They thought Paine sought attention for herself, an opinion Marina would later express before the Warren Commission. When Marina testified in the Shaw trial, she said she had been "advised by Secret Service not to be connected with her [Ruth Paine] ... she was sympathizing with the CIA." Ruth wrote to Marina incessantly, with letters that took an almost desperate tone, but received no response except for a Christmas card. They met briefly in 1964 but did not see each other after that. Paine heard news about Marina through author Priscilla Johnson McMillan until McMillan's relationship with Marina broke off in the early 1980s.

Ruth Paine returned to Pennsylvania and became principal of a Quaker school in the Greene Street Friends School in Germantown. She soon moved to St. Petersburg, Florida and earned a master's degree in psychology from the University of South Florida. After working for the school system in Franklin County in the Florida Panhandle, she returned to St. Petersburg and worked for the Hillsborough County, Florida school system until her retirement. She was active in Quaker and liberal charities and organizations and lived in Santa Rosa, California.

In 1970, Ruth divorced from Michael Paine. During the 1980s, following the overthrow of the Nicaraguan dictator Somoza by the socialist Sandinistas, Paine began her involvement with the Quaker group ProNica. Between 1990 and 2000 she made nine trips to the country.

The City of Irving bought the former Paine home on W. 5th St. in 2009 to restore it to its 1963 condition and turn it into a museum in time for the 50th anniversary of the Kennedy assassination on November 22, 2013.

Paine was interviewed by several authors, including Priscilla Johnson McMillan, William Manchester, Thomas Mallon, and Gerald Posner. While Warren Commission supporters have been kind to her, several assassination conspiracy theorists have questioned Paine's testimony, as well as her husband, Michael. Author and researcher Sylvia Meagher wrote:

Ruth Paine...is a complex personality, despite her rather passive façade...Some examples from her testimony show a predisposition against Oswald and a real or pretended friendliness toward the FBI and other Establishment institutions, which should not be overlooked in evaluating her role in the case...Mrs. Paine is sometimes a devious person, and her testimony must be evaluated in that light.

When Paine went to Nicaragua, several fellow Quakers, including volunteer Sue Wheaton, questioned her intentions and motivations, noting that Nicaragua was a CIA hot-spot and that they suspected Paine was gathering information.

Paine expressed her belief in the official conclusion that Oswald acted alone and disavowed conspiracy theorists' suggestions to connect her and Michael to their relatives and ancestors holding important government and business positions, such as her sister, Sylvia Hyde Hoke, who was employed as a psychologist for the CIA under military cover, and her father, who was also considered for CIA use; Ruth stated she was unaware of her sister’s job. She also refuted allegations that during the police search at her house on November 22, she greeted officers with "I've been expecting you all", and stated that a set of metal filing cabinets, which appeared to contain the names of Cuban sympathisers, was her disc records of songs.

=== Death ===
Paine died of natural causes at a Quaker retirement residence in Santa Rosa, California, on August 31, 2025, after being in a coma for five days; she was three days shy of her 93rd birthday.

== In media ==
Paine has been portrayed by:

- Gail Cronauer (1991) – JFK; Ruth and Michael are renamed as the highly suspect Janet and Bill Williams to avoid potential legal action.
- Quenby Bakke – (1993 TV movie) Fatal Deception: Mrs. Lee Harvey Oswald; Ruth was renamed again as Janet Williams.
- Natalie Gold (2013) – Killing Kennedy
- Miranda Calderon (2016) – 11.22.63

The 2022 documentary The Assassination & Mrs. Paine explores the Paines and their connections to the assassination.
