= Charles Morris Young =

American painter

- Born: September 23, 1869; Pennsylvania, United States
- Died: November 14, 1964 (aged 95); Radnor, Pennsylvania, United States
- Education: Pennsylvania Academy of the Fine Arts, Académie Julian, Académie Colarossi
- Occupation: Painter

Charles Morris Young (September 23, 1869 – November 14, 1964) was an American painter. His work was part of the art competitions at the 1928 Summer Olympics and the 1932 Summer Olympics.

== Biography ==
Charles Morris Young was born on September 23, 1869, in Gettysburg, Pennsylvania.

He graduated from the Pennsylvania Academy of the Fine Arts in Philadelphia; and continued his studies in Paris at Académie Julian, and Académie Colarossi. He worked under artists René-Xavier Prinet, and Ernest Gustave Girardot.

Starting in 1917, he lived in Radnor near Philadelphia, and spent the summers in Maine. He was known for his landscape paintings, particularly of Pennsylvania and Maine. In 1962, his home suffered a fire and he lost three hundred of his paintings.

He died on November 14, 1964 at the age of 95, in his home in Radnor, Pennsylvania.
