= Michael Paine =

American engineer and acquaintance of Lee Harvey Oswald (1928–2018)

- Born: Michael Ralph Paine; June 25, 1928; New York City, U.S.
- Died: March 1, 2018 (aged 89); Sebastopol, California, U.S.
- Education: Harvard University; Swarthmore College
- Occupation: Engineer
- Spouse: Ruth Avery Hyde (m. 1957; div. 1970)
- Children: 2
- Parents: Lyman Paine (father); Ruth Forbes Young (mother)

Michael Ralph Paine (June 25, 1928 – March 1, 2018) was an American engineer who became notable after the assassination of U.S. President John F. Kennedy, as he was an acquaintance of Lee Harvey Oswald. His wife, Ruth Paine, housed Oswald's wife, Marina Oswald, in her home for several months until the day after the assassination. Supporters of the Warren Commission's analysis of the assassination have generally had a positive view of the Paines, but various conspiracy theorists have speculated that they may have had an ulterior motive.

== Early life ==
Paine was born in New York City. His father was Lyman Paine, an architect and activist. His mother was Ruth Forbes Young, financial backer of International Peace Academy and a member of the Cabot and Forbes families. He had one sibling, Cameron Paine.

Paine graduated from high school in New York in 1947. He attended Harvard University for two years in 1947–1949 and Swarthmore College for a year, but did not graduate.

== Career ==
After serving in the U.S. Army, Paine worked a few months for Griswold Manufacturing Co. and for about a year at the Bartol Research Foundation in Swarthmore, Pennsylvania. He then worked for his mother's third husband Arthur M. Young, the designer of the first commercial helicopter, making helicopter models. With the assistance of Young, he was hired by Bell Helicopter in 1958.

== Personal life ==
In 1957, Paine married Ruth Avery Hyde in Pennsylvania. They had two children. In 1959, they relocated from Pennsylvania to a house in Irving, Texas, a Dallas suburb, when Paine began work at a Bell Helicopter facility in Fort Worth.

In late September 1962, Paine and his wife separated, according to him at her urging. She asked him to remove his belongings from the house before she returned from traveling around the United States. He rented an apartment in Grand Prairie, while she and the children remained in the house in Irving. The divorce became final in 1970; meanwhile the couple continued madrigal singing and movie going together, and after the divorce Michael retained a very favorable view of Ruth.

On February 22, 1963, Ruth Paine attended a party at the home of her fellow madrigal singer, Everett Glover, who knew that she was learning to speak Russian and introduced her to Marina and Lee Harvey Oswald. Lee Oswald had defected to the USSR after serving in the Marine Corps, and Marina was Russian-born. They had recently returned to the United States with their young daughter. Glover had also invited many of his engineer friends in Dallas, including George de Mohrenschildt, Volkmar Schmidt, and Michael Paine, who was unable to be there. At the party, Ruth Paine began a close friendship with Marina Oswald. That spring, according to an FBI report, Michael Paine was identified as having bragged about knowing "an ex-Marine who had recently returned to the States with a Russian wife" while discussing "communism in general and Cuba in particular" with students from Southern Methodist University in a pro-Castro manner. He may have been seeking to identify communist sympathizers in order to report them.

== Relationship with Lee Harvey Oswald ==
He met the Oswalds for the first time on April 2, 1963, when he drove them to Ruth Paine's house for dinner at her request. (They did not have a car.) He later told the Warren Commission that he took an immediate dislike to Lee Oswald, who barked orders at his wife Marina from the living room. He told writer Thomas Mallon that he pitied her for "having to take these whiplashes meekly and quietly and obediently." Over the next seven months, he told the Warren Commission, he was continually upset by the fact that Lee Oswald refused to let Marina learn English.

He did not tell the Warren Commission that Lee Oswald had also used that time to speak with him about his fervent political views and to proudly display a now-famous "backyard photograph", one of four known photos of Lee holding his rifle, wearing his pistol, and displaying two Marxist newspapers. In 1993, he told Gus Russo, author of Live by the Sword (1998) that Lee Oswald showed him the photograph that day, but he swore to the Warren Commission that he had "no idea" that Lee Oswald ever had a rifle. He also did not emphasize for the Warren Commission the several talks that he had with Oswald about the radical right wing and resigned General Edwin Walker, who had been making trouble for Kennedy since October 1962. He only said that he and Oswald "agreed" about Walker.

The Warren Commission was far more interested in the fact that Lee Harvey Oswald lived in a rented room in Dallas, but stored most of his possessions in the garage at Ruth Paine's garage. This is because Marina Oswald told Dallas Police that Lee Oswald kept an army rifle there, wrapped in a blanket. Michael Paine told the Warren Commission that he always thought it was camping equipment. Ruth Paine helped Oswald get a job at the Texas School Book Depository. Paine's testimony later became a central feature of the Warren Commission's investigation of the assassination, particularly in regard to the presence of the purported assassination rifle in the garage of his family home.

On the day of the assassination, Michael Paine was overheard on the telephone telling his wife that he was sure Oswald shot the President, and also added: “We both know who is responsible”. He was asked about this during his testimony.

While Warren Commission supporters have been kind to the Paines, several assassination conspiracy theorists have questioned their testimony because they had links to government agencies. These included Michael Paine's work at Bell Helicopter, which linked him to intelligence agencies; family connections to the Cabot and Forbes families; and a mother on the FBI Security Index.

== Later life and death ==
In 1964, Paine testified that he was a member of the American Civil Liberties Union.

In 1970, the Paines both divorced.

Michael Paine died at the age of 89 on March 1, 2018, in Sebastopol, California.

== In media ==
Paine and his wife were portrayed in Oliver Stone's JFK under the names "Bill and Janet Williams", presumably to avoid legal action. The 2022 documentary The Assassination & Mrs. Paine explores the Paines and their connections to the assassination.
