= Marina Oswald Porter =

Wife of Lee Harvey Oswald (born 1941)

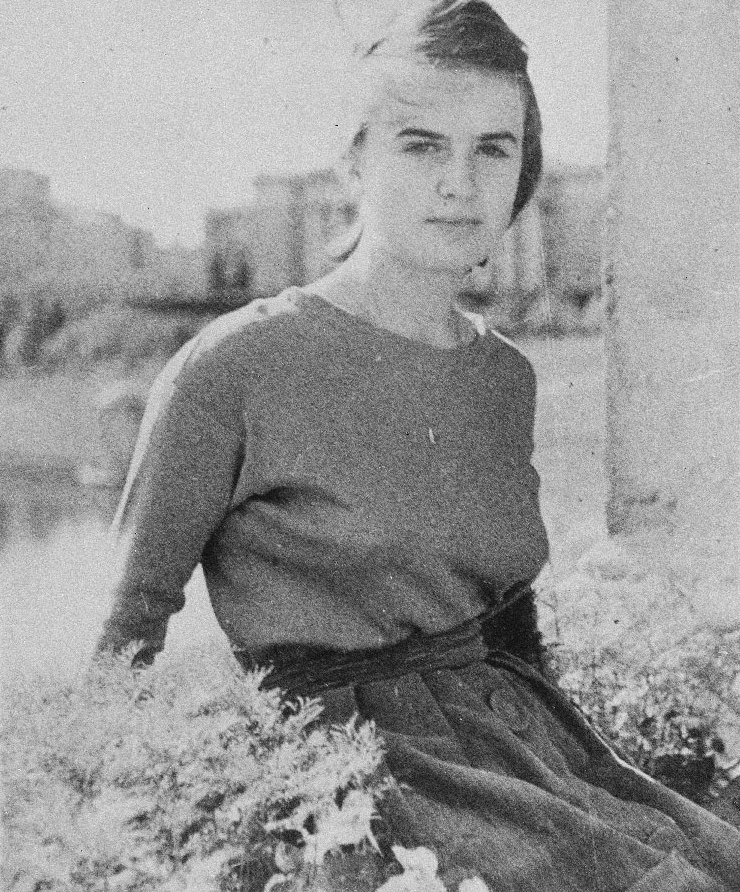
- Porter (then Prusakova) in Minsk, 1961
- Born: Marina Nikolayevna Prusakova; July 17, 1941 (age 85); Molotovsk, Russian SFSR, Soviet Union
- Citizenship: United States
- Occupation: Pharmacist
- Known for: Marriage with Lee Harvey Oswald
- Spouses: Lee Harvey Oswald (m. 1961; died 1963); Kenneth Jess Porter (m. 1965; div. 1974)
- Children: 3

Marina Nikolayevna Oswald Porter (Note: In this name that follows East Slavic naming customs, the patronymic is Nikolayevna and the family name is Porter.) (Note: Russian: Марина Николаевна Освальд Портер.) (née Prusakova; (Note: Russian: Прусакова.) born July 17, 1941) is a Russian and American woman who was the wife of Lee Harvey Oswald.

Born in the Soviet Union, Marina emigrated to the United States after marrying Lee Oswald during his temporary defection to the Soviet Bloc. After the assassination of U.S. President John F. Kennedy and Oswald's murder, Marina testified against Oswald for the Warren Commission and remarried, becoming a naturalized United States citizen. Although Marina initially publicly supported the Warren Commission's findings, she ultimately expressed doubts and advocated for Oswald's innocence. Notably, she expressed belief that Oswald was the unidentified "Prayer Man" filmed on the steps of the Texas School Book Depository by James Darnell and Dave Wiegman as Kennedy was assassinated. (Note: Not to be confused with depository employee Billy Lovelady being mistaken for Oswald in the Ike Altgens photo taken of the Depository doorway; see § The man resembling Lee Harvey Oswald.)

== Early life and education ==
Marina was born Marina Nikolayevna Prusakova (Russian: Марина Николаевна Прусакова) on July 17, 1941, in the city of Molotovsk (now Severodvinsk), in the Russian SFSR of the Soviet Union. She lived there with her mother and stepfather until 1957, when she moved to Minsk in the Byelorussian SSR to live with her uncle Ilya Prusakov, who was a colonel in the country's Ministry of Internal Affairs. While in Minsk, she studied pharmacology. She produced her diploma in her exit visa from the Soviet Union certifying that she graduated secondary pharmaceutical training as a pharmacist from the Leningrad Pharmaceutical School (LFU) on June 29, 1959.

== Marriage to Lee Harvey Oswald ==
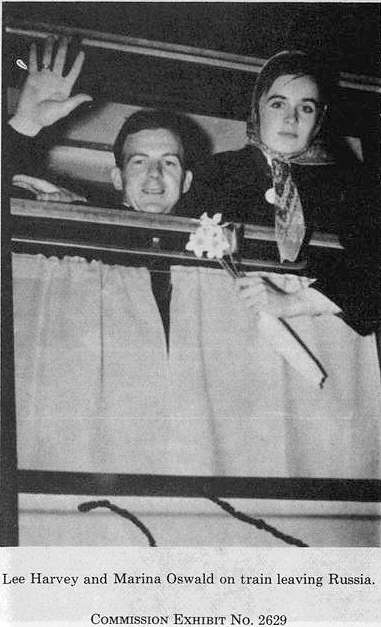
Marina and her husband Lee Harvey Oswald leaving the Soviet Union, 1962

Marina met Lee Harvey Oswald, a former U.S. Marine who had defected to the Soviet Union, at a dance on March 17, 1961. They married six weeks later on April 30 in Minsk and had a daughter, June Lee Oswald, born in February 1962. Lee and Marina arrived in the US on 13 June 1962, onboard the Maasdam and landed at Hoboken in New Jersey. Here they were met by Spas T. Raikin of the Travelers Aid Society, who had been contacted by the US Department of State. He took them to the New York City Department of Welfare where they were processed. They eventually settled in Fort Worth, Texas where Lee's brother Robert lived at the time. At a party in February 1963, George de Mohrenschildt introduced the couple to Ruth Paine, a Quaker and Russian language student. The Oswalds moved to Dallas and then to New Orleans, Louisiana in 1963 before returning to Dallas later in 1963.

The Warren Commission later concluded that in January 1963, Oswald mail-ordered a Smith & Wesson .38 revolver and then, in March, a Mannlicher–Carcano, the rifle used to shoot Kennedy.

On March 2, 1963, Lee Oswald was told by his landlord to stop beating his wife or move out. The Oswalds quickly moved to the West Neely Street apartment that would later become famous for the photos taken in the back yard. Later that month, as Marina told the Warren Commission, she took photographs of Oswald dressed in black and holding his weapons along with an issue of The Militant newspaper, which named ex-general Edwin Walker as a "fascist." Two of these photographs were later found in the garage of the Paine household. A third one was in the possession of George de Mohrenschildt.

The photo that had been given to de Mohrenschildt was signed and dated by Lee Oswald on April 5, 1963, five days before the attempted assassination of Walker. De Mohrenschildt eventually revealed this photograph to the House Select Committee on Assassinations (HSCA) in 1977, shortly before his death. It is similar to the photo published by LIFE magazine in early 1964, except that it has a much more extensive background. The image also has a quote in Russian, the translation of which reads, "Hunter of Fascists, Ha-Ha-Ha!!!"

In April 1963, Marina and her daughter moved in with Paine (who had recently separated from her husband, Michael) at 2515 W. 5th Street in Irving, Texas. Lee Oswald rented a separate room in Dallas and briefly moved to New Orleans during the summer of 1963. He returned to Dallas in early October, eventually renting a room in a boarding house in the Oak Cliff neighborhood of Dallas.

Ruth Paine learned from a neighbor that employment was available at the Texas School Book Depository, and Oswald was hired and began working there on October 16, 1963, as an order filler. On October 18, Marina and Ruth Paine had planned a birthday party for Oswald. They put up some decorations and got a birthday cake and wine. Oswald was so moved by the gesture that he had tears in his eyes. He remained emotional throughout the evening, crying and apologizing to Marina for everything he had put her through. On October 20, Marina gave birth to a second daughter, Audrey Marina Rachel Oswald, at Parkland Memorial Hospital. Her husband continued to live in Oak Cliff on weekdays, but stayed with her and Paine on weekends, an arrangement that continued until Oswald was arrested for the assassination of President Kennedy.

=== Assassination of John F. Kennedy ===
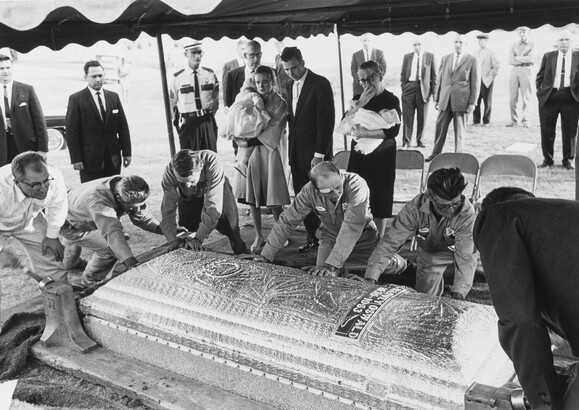
Marina Oswald (left) at Lee Oswald's funeral with Lee's brother Robert Oswald, and Oswald mother, Marguerite Oswald

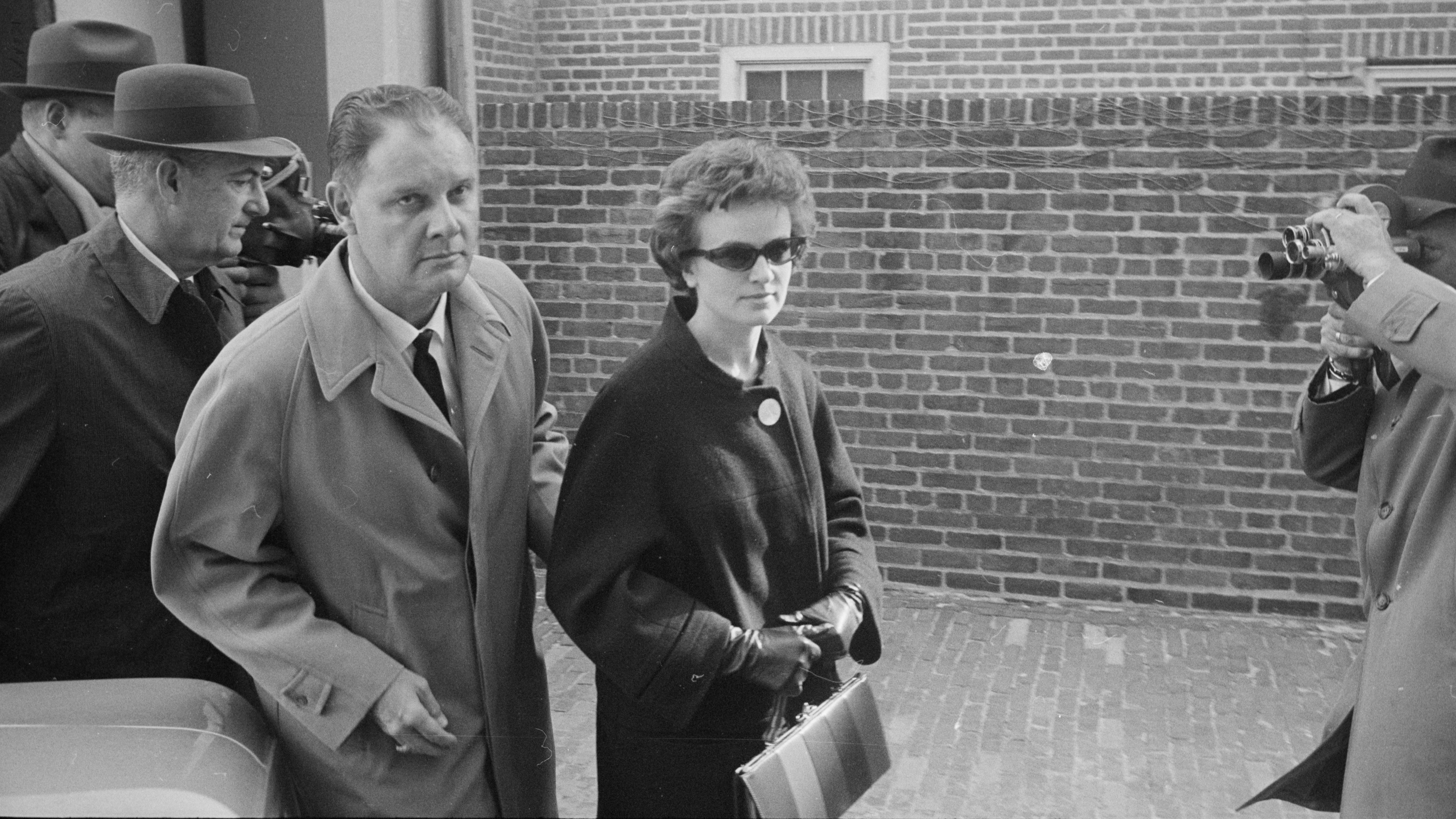
Marina Oswald before testifying to the Warren Commission

Marina learned of the assassination of John F. Kennedy from the media coverage of the event and, later, of the arrest of her husband. That afternoon, Dallas Police Department detectives arrived at the Paine household, and when asked if Lee owned a rifle, Marina gestured to the garage, where Oswald stored his rifle rolled up in a blanket; no rifle was found. She was subsequently questioned both at the Paine household and later at Dallas Police Department headquarters about her husband's involvement in the death of John F. Kennedy and the murder of Dallas police officer J. D. Tippit. Marina and Lee Oswald's mother, Marguerite Oswald, arrived at Dallas City Hall in the evening. Marina was shown the rifle by Carl Day and said in her statement that she was not sure whether the rifle shown to her was Lee's. Captain J. W. Fritz of the Homicide and Robbery Bureau stated in a report that Marina did not positively ID the rifle. On the afternoon of November 23, Marina and Marguerite talked to Lee. Marina said that when she saw her husband, he was calm, but "by his eyes I could tell that he was afraid. He said goodbye to me with his eyes. I knew that."

Two days later, on November 24, Marina was widowed at age 22, when Oswald was murdered by Jack Ruby. Marina asked to go to Parkland Hospital to see Oswald's body. She opened his eyelids and said, "He cry, he eye wet."

Marina came to live in a hotel with business adviser James H. Martin who said there were "a few threats on her life mixed with the thousands of letters of sympathy she has received". After the assassination of Kennedy and the arrest of her husband, Marina was under Secret Service protection until she completed her testimony before the Warren Commission. Her house was wiretapped and bugged by the FBI, although the FBI never informed the Warren Commission that they had done so. She testified that she "had never heard anything bad about Kennedy from Lee" and that while in Russia, Oswald told her he would vote for Governor John Connally when he returned to the United States. In her testimony, she stated her belief that her husband was guilty, an opinion she reiterated in testimony before the House Select Committee on Assassinations in 1978, where she claimed that Oswald's motivation was not political.

== Later life ==
Following the assassination, Marina rented a house in Richardson, Texas, a suburb of Dallas, where she also found work as a drugstore clerk. Donations sent to her by anonymous donors totaled about $70,000, roughly equivalent to $727,000 in 2025. She sold Lee's Russian diary for $20,000 and a picture of him holding the rifle for $5,000. She also attempted, but failed, to gain possession of the gun to sell it. (Note: William Manchester, The Death of a President) Marina refused to change her name and received various marriage proposals. She worried about her children and said her sympathy lay with Jacqueline Kennedy, stating, "It's hard enough to lose a bad husband... I wonder how it is to lose a good one." In November 1964, Marina Oswald became increasingly tense and morose, and she checked into a hospital for nervous exhaustion.

In January 1965, Marina enrolled at the University of Michigan, but she later returned to the Dallas area and bought a house in Richardson. In 1981, Marina had Oswald's body exhumed to refute a claim that a look-alike Russian Soviet agent was buried in place of Oswald, as well as to confirm that the remains had not been stolen from the tomb by graverobbers. In 1989, she became a naturalized United States citizen.

In 1969, Marina testified for the defense in the trial of Clay Shaw. In 1977, she appeared on The Dick Cavett Show with Priscilla Johnson McMillan.

=== Marriage to Kenneth Jess Porter ===
On June 1, 1965, Marina and electronics worker Kenneth Jess Porter traveled to Fate, Texas, and were wed by a justice of the peace. Two months later, Marina accused Kenneth of domestic violence in an argument about leaving the children alone; the judge admonished them to stay out of the public eye and stop quarreling.

Marina moved to Rockwall, Texas, with her husband and family, and they avoided publicity for decades. The Porters had a son. Although they divorced in 1974, they reconciled and continued to live together as a couple. On October 8, 2024, Kenneth died in their family home at the age of 86. As of 2026, Marina continues to live in private.

=== Support for Lee Oswald's innocence ===
Though Marina has not formally recanted any of her Warren Commission testimony, stating that she wanted to initially deny the possibility of her husband's guilt, she began stating, in various interviews from the late 1980s, that she ultimately believed that Oswald was innocent of the murders of President Kennedy and Officer Tippit, and that she believed Oswald worked for the government. Jim Martin, her manager, said that he felt that despite her testifying against him, he did not "really think she thought he was guilty". Jim Leavelle, the Dallas Police detective handcuffed to Oswald when Ruby shot him, had several meals with Marina and said that Marina would "sound him out" to see if he had any doubts on Oswald's guilt. Ruth Paine, estranged from Marina for years, dismissed her changing viewpoints, stating, "I thought she was a better thinker than that".

In 1988, Marina granted an interview to Ladies Home Journal where she expressed her belief that there was a conspiracy and that "Lee was killed to keep his mouth shut". That same year she was interviewed for the Jack Anderson documentary American Expose: Who Killed JFK?.

In 2018, Marina was contacted by conspiracy theorists for the theory that the unidentified "prayer man" filmed on the steps of the Texas School Book Depository during the assassination by Dave Wiegman, Jr., of NBC, and James Darnell, of WBAP-TV, was Oswald. Ed Ledoux phoned Marina after Stan Dane had sent her enlargements of the Darnell and Wiegman films showing the "prayer man" figure. An unprompted Marina volunteered, "It's Lee". Marina remained confident that Oswald was the figure, saying "you only have to compare two faces, Lee's and Billy Lovelady.". In 2025, Anna Paulina Luna, U.S. representative for Florida, initiated a lawsuit against the US government for the release of the original films.

Marina's daughters also gave several interviews, in which they expressed skepticism regarding Oswald's guilt though they also say they just want to know the truth. In a 1995 interview with The New York Times, June Oswald, the Oswalds' older child, said when asked on the matter of her father's guilt or innocence: "It would make a difference in the sense of justice being served. If the truth can be found that shows Lee had nothing to do with the assassination, I would feel better in that there have been a lot of things said and done regarding my family that all proceeded from an erroneous perception of what he did or didn't do."

== In media ==
Oswald appears as a character in Don DeLillo's 1988 novel Libra and Stephen King's 2011 novel 11/22/63.

Oswald has been portrayed on screen by:

- Mo Malone in The Trial of Lee Harvey Oswald (1977)
- Lanna Saunders in Ruby and Oswald (1978)
- Beata Poźniak in JFK (1991);
- Natasha Pavlovich in the 1992 two-part season 5 premiere of Quantum Leap;
- Helena Bonham Carter in Fatal Deception: Mrs. Lee Harvey Oswald (1993);
- Michelle Trachtenberg in Killing Kennedy (2013);
- Lucy Fry in 11.22.63 (2016).

== Bibliography ==
- Bugliosi, Vincent (2007). Reclaiming History: The Assassination of President John F. Kennedy. WW Norton & Co. ISBN 978-0-393-07212-9..
- Groden, Robert J. (1995), The Search for Lee Harvey Oswald: A Comprehensive Photographic Record, Bloomsbury, ISBN 0-747-52401-7.
