= Lee Harvey Oswald Rooming House =

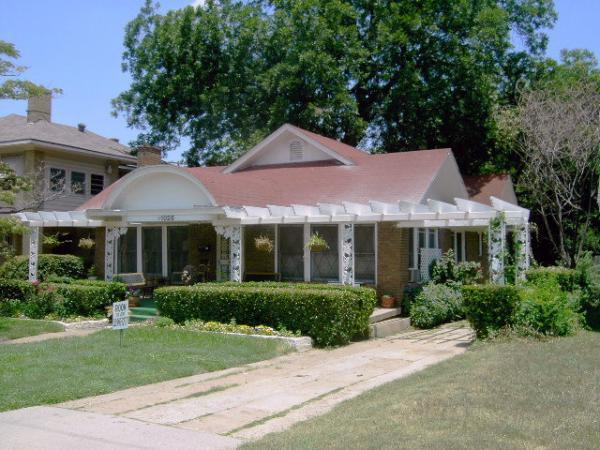

- Location in Texas Lee Harvey Oswald Rooming House (the United States)

General information
- Location: 1026 N. Beckley Avenue, Dallas, Texas
- Coordinates: 32.7556672°N 96.822885°W
- Construction started: 1935

The house at 1026 N. Beckley Avenue in the Oak Cliff section of Dallas, Texas was the temporary residence of Lee Harvey Oswald at the time of the assassination of United States President John F. Kennedy. Oswald rented a room at this house for $8 a week, beginning October 14, 1963, under the name O.H. Lee. The building is located approximately 2 miles (3.2 km) from the Texas School Book Depository, where Oswald began working on October 16.

== History ==
Built in 1935, the three-bedroom home was bought by Gladys Johnson in 1943. It is now within the Lake Cliff historic district. Johnson's granddaughter, Patricia Hall, restored Oswald's bedroom and maintains the living room as it was in 1963 when Johnson's housekeeper, Earlene Roberts, was interviewed there after the assassination. Since 2009, she has opened the house for paid tours as the Oswald Rooming House Museum.

== Kennedy assassination ==
Beginning October 14, 1963, Lee Harvey Oswald rented a small room in the Johnson house for $8 a week. He slept there on weeknights, and went back on weekends to suburban Irving, where his wife and children were living. On the date of the assassination, November 22, Oswald returned to his room immediately after shooting President John F. Kennedy from a sixth floor window of the Texas School Book Depository. According to housekeeper Roberts, Oswald entered the home in a "hurry", grabbed a jacket and left on foot three to four minutes later. He made no comment to Earlene when she told him about the Kennedy assassination, which was now all over the news and on TV.

Shortly thereafter, Oswald was confronted by Dallas Police officer J. D. Tippit less than one mile (1.6 km) away from the house. After exchanging a few words, Oswald fatally shot Tippit; a short time later, he was arrested at the Texas Theatre.

== See also ==
- Ruth Paine Home, the house in Irving where Oswald spent the night before the assassination with his wife
