= Priscilla Johnson McMillan =

American author and historian (1928–2021)

- Born: Priscilla Mary Post Johnson; July 19, 1928; Glen Cove, New York, U.S.
- Died: July 7, 2021 (aged 92); Cambridge, Massachusetts, U.S.
- Education: Bryn Mawr College (BA, 1950); Radcliffe College/Harvard University (MA, 1953)
- Occupations: Journalist; translator; author; historian
- Years active: 1958–2021
- Notable credits: North American Newspaper Alliance; The Reporter
- Spouse: George McMillan (m. 1966; div. 1980)

Priscilla Johnson McMillan (born Priscilla Mary Post Johnson) (July 19, 1928 – July 7, 2021) was an American journalist, translator, author, and historian. She was a Center Associate at the Davis Center for Russian and Eurasian Studies at Harvard University.

At the beginning of her career, she worked for Senator John F. Kennedy and saw him informally for several years thereafter. During the late 1950s, she served as reporter in Moscow for the North American Newspaper Alliance, and interviewed Lee Harvey Oswald as he was defecting to the Soviet Union in 1959. Following the assassination of President Kennedy and Oswald's murder, she became friends with Oswald's widow, Marina Oswald, and published the acclaimed study Marina and Lee: The Tormented Love and Fatal Obsession Behind Lee Harvey Oswald's Assassination of John F. Kennedy (1977). She also published Khrushchev and the Arts: The Politics of Soviet Culture, 1962–1964 (1965) with co-editor Leopold Labedz and The Ruin of J. Robert Oppenheimer and the Birth of the Modern Arms Race (2005) about the Oppenheimer security hearing.

Johnson was the only individual who, to a significant extent, personally knew both President Kennedy and Lee Oswald. (Note: Some sources describe Priscilla Johnson as the only person who knew both Kennedy and Oswald. However, two other people are known to have crossed paths with both of them: Joan Hallet, who was a receptionist at the U.S. Embassy in Moscow when Oswald went there, and her husband Oliver Hallet, who also served at the embassy. The Hallets subsequently moved to Washington where he was a junior naval officer in the White House, and as such both got to meet President Kennedy. Like Priscilla Johnson, Joan Hallet is said to have recognized Oswald when news of his arrest for the assassination became known.)

== Early life and education ==
Priscilla Mary Post Johnson was born in Glen Cove, New York, on July 19, 1928, the third of four children to Stuart H. Johnson, a financier who had inherited a company that made textiles, and Mary Eunice (Clapp) Johnson, a homemaker. She grew up in the affluent hamlet of Locust Valley, New York, on the North Shore of Long Island. Her family, which descended from the Pilgrims, was prominent and had an entry in the Social Register.

She attended the private, all-girls Brearley School in New York City. She played competitive tennis, appearing in tournaments on Long Island. She was active in politics while at Brearley and thought that the nascent United Nations should have greater powers so as to be able to control nuclear weapons in the emerging Atomic Age.

Johnson attended Bryn Mawr College, graduating in 1950, and majored in Russian language and literature. She was an advocate of the World Federalist Movement, belonging to the large chapter of the United World Federalists at the school. She also played for the Bryn Mawr tennis team. Johnson applied to join the CIA during this time but was rejected due to her membership of the UWF.

She went on to earn a master's degree in Russian area studies at Radcliffe College (Harvard University) in 1953. She also became fluent in the Russian language.

== Congressional aide and reporter ==
Following graduation in 1953, Johnson secured a brief position with the office of Senator John F. Kennedy of Massachusetts, where she worked on research regarding French Indochina. The recently married Kennedy indicated some amorous interest in her, but no affair between them took place; in a 2013 interview with News.com.au, Johnson reflected that "I didn't love him. He was mesmerising but he was just someone I knew." Johnson saw Kennedy on a number of occasions over the next four years, including visiting him in the hospital following back surgeries that he underwent. In one case, Johnson posed as one of Kennedy's sisters in order to get past nurses and bring newspapers to him. In a 2013 interview with The Atlantic, Johnson recalled that "the doctors didn't think he could survive major surgery" but that Kennedy was nonetheless constantly on the phone in political discussions or was "peppering me with questions – what I thought about politics, my personal life, anything."

She worked as an editor and translator at the Current Digest of Soviet Press in New York City from 1953 to 1956. She also did translations of the Soviet Union's briefings at the Geneva "Big Four" summit of 1955.

Her first stint in the Soviet Union consisted of 3½ months in 1955–56 when she had a student-tourist visa to study Soviet law. She spent time in Moscow, Leningrad, and Kiev. She witnessed the Soviet courts in action and was more audacious in her approach to Soviet society than was expected of a single woman in the early Cold War era. Her experiences and thoughts regarding Soviet politics, fashion, and ordinary life got press attention when they were written up by Leonard Lyons, author of "The Lyons Den" syndicated column in American papers. She also spent time with Truman Capote, who captured some of their experiences in his 1956 non-fiction book The Muses Are Heard. While in the USSR she often asked people about fashion, finding it a good approach topic for asking personal questions. This included a visit to Leningrad Fashion House, one of the centers of Soviet style. Her observations on Soviet fashion and Soviet attitudes regarding Western fashion were profiled in The Boston Daily Globe. While there she also acted as a translator at the Embassy of the United States, Moscow. On her return to America she was interviewed by the head of the CIA's Soviet Russia division, Donald Jameson, who wrote in a memo she could "be encouraged to write the articles we want....but it’s important to avoid making her think she’s being used as a propaganda tool".

Johnson transitioned to journalism, and from 1958 to 1960 she was stationed in Moscow, where she filed stories for the North American Newspaper Alliance. These included topics such as the reaction in the Soviet literary magazine Novy Mir to the American Beat Generation writers. An executive with the Alliance described her performance there: "Priscilla was the kind of correspondent the Russians were wary of in those days. She knew too much about Soviet history, law, and politics to be bamboozled by propaganda handouts from the [Soviet government]. And with her expert knowledge of the language she could fine-comb the Russian press for story leads."

In November 1959, at the Hotel Metropol Moscow, she met and interviewed the 20-year-old Lee Harvey Oswald, who was in the process of defecting to the USSR. She talked with him for five or six hours. The story she wrote that appeared in North American papers began with Oswald saying, "For two years now I have been waiting to do this one thing. To dissolve my American citizenship and become a citizen of the Soviet Union." The piece consisted of Johnson describing Oswald's past life and the difficulties of defecting, and quotes of Oswald's Marxist-derived explanations of why he wanted to move to a different politico-economic system.

Following the 1960 U-2 incident, Johnson was one of many Americans expelled by the Soviet Union as a sign of their unhappiness with the American overflights. Johnson became a visiting scholar at Harvard University's Russian Research Center, a position she held from 1961 through the next some years. She was readmitted to the Soviet Union in 1962, this time working for The Reporter magazine, for which she wrote stories about intellectual life and Russian culture. However, the authorities seized her notebooks just before her return to the United States, claiming that they contained anti-Soviet propaganda.

In 1965, she was a significant contributor to, and co-editor of the academic volume Khrushchev and the Arts: The Politics of Soviet Culture, 1962–1964, which included some of the articles she had written while in the USSR. A review noted how the book traced a brief opening up of the arts during the Khrushchev Thaw before the premier himself directed a reversion to formulaic socialist realism.

On November 22, 1963, Johnson was first shocked by the news of Kennedy's death, and then a second time by the identification of the suspect arrested, exclaiming to a friend: "My God, I know that boy!" Because of her interview with Oswald, she was called to testify before the Warren Commission that investigated the assassination.

== Author and scholar ==
In July 1964, she moved to the Dallas area and befriended Oswald's widow, Marina Nikolayevna Prusakova Oswald. Johnson's fluency in Russian was an important factor in the relationship, since Marina had limited English. The two spent several months together, with Johnson helping care for Marina's young children. Johnson signed a contract with Harper & Row for a book to be published about the Oswalds, with two-thirds of the advance going to Marina. The book project was disclosed in November 1964, with an expected publication date during 1965. Her work on the book ended up taking over a decade and consumed much of her life.

She took the name Priscilla Johnson McMillan when she married George McMillan in 1966. He was a freelance writer who covered the civil rights movement in the American South, and wrote a history of the 1st Marine Division, The Old Breed. They divorced in the early 1980s.

In 1967, McMillan translated the memoirs of Svetlana Alliluyeva, Stalin's daughter, who had gained much attention that year by defecting to the United States. There was considerable competition among translators and publishers for the assignment, but a recommendation from former U.S. Ambassador and foreign policy legend George F. Kennan helped her get it. She had first encountered Svetlana twelve years earlier, during her first visit to the Soviet Union, when under the name Stalina, she had taught a class at Moscow State University. Svetlana spent her first weeks in America staying at McMillan's father's estate in Locust Valley.

Marina and Lee: The Tormented Love and Fatal Obsession Behind Lee Harvey Oswald's Assassination of John F. Kennedy, was ultimately published by Harper & Row in 1977. It received many positive reviews upon release. The New York Times Book Review wrote of "what a miraculous book Priscilla Johnson McMillan has written, miraculous because McMillan had the wit, courage and perseverance to go back to the heart of the story, and the art to give it life." Some reviewers considered it the best work on the assassination, or superior to the Warren Commission Report, or akin to a Dostoevsky novel. However, it contained no conspiracy theories, only a very in-depth portrait of an unsuccessful, troubled, sometimes violent and ultimately small man, and sales of the book were modest. Marina would later say that she contributed little to the book: "It was up to Priscilla to fish out all the facts and everything and put them together some way".

Following publication, McMillan continued to work as a freelance writer, often reviewing books. Her topics of interest included nuclear policy and post-Soviet Russia. She wrote an obituary of physicist Edward Teller in the Bulletin of the Atomic Scientists that emphasized the contradictions in Teller's life. For a while she was an adjunct fellow at the Center for Science and International Affairs at Kennedy School of Government at Harvard.

During the 1980s, members of a memorial committee dedicated to preserving the legacy of physicist J. Robert Oppenheimer approached McMillan and asked her to write a new account of the much-discussed Oppenheimer security hearing of 1954. She was granted greater-than-usual access to Los Alamos National Laboratory as part of her research. Her work was eventually published in 2005 as The Ruin of J. Robert Oppenheimer and the Birth of the Modern Arms Race. In it she emphasized the role that Atomic Energy Commission member Lewis Strauss had played in the campaign against Oppenheimer, even ascribing to Strauss the famous "blank wall" that President Dwight D. Eisenhower ordered be placed between Oppenheimer and any defense-related activities. She also examined other people involved in the Oppenheimer matter, including exploring differences of opinion among commissioners during the period in question.

Her book was published right after Kai Bird's and Martin Sherwin's Pulitzer Prize-winning biography American Prometheus: The Triumph and Tragedy of J. Robert Oppenheimer, but nonetheless McMillan's book attracted some favorable attention, such as from the New York Times Book Review. Foreign Affairs magazine said McMillan's work was "shorter and sharper" than the Bird–Sherwin one and "focuses more on the policy issues at the heart of the drama". More than other biographies of Oppenheimer, hers attempted to draw parallels and significance to contemporary issues, especially regarding scientific-government relations.

McMillan was interviewed for the 1993 documentary Who Was Lee Harvey Oswald? produced by PBS's Frontline and appeared as a witness at a public hearing conducted by the Assassination Records Review Board held in Boston on 24 March 1995. Marina and Lee was republished in 2013, in conjunction with the fiftieth anniversary of Kennedy's death. Upon release, Publishers Weekly called it a "classic of the JFK assassination literature" and said that "McMillan's richly detailed, bleak, heartbreaking profile proves [Oswald]'s unfitness for any conspiracy outside his own head—and builds a compelling case for him as the demon-driven author of the Kennedy tragedy." McMillan participated in a number of media engagements, reflecting upon her time with Kennedy and the Oswalds.

Throughout the years, McMillan's stance had drawn the enmity of Kennedy assassination conspiracists. There were claims, especially online, that she had been working for the CIA during the time in the Soviet Union and may have later been involved in covering up the truth about the Kennedy assassination, claims that she adamantly denied. She remained confident that Oswald had acted alone, saying "I'm just as sure now as I was then that he did it, and also that he couldn't have done it with anybody else. He wasn't somebody who, in his life, had ever done anything with anybody else." Subsequently declassified CIA files later confirmed McMillan's relationship to the CIA. In 1975 a CIA official reviewed McMillan's CIA file and determined she was a "witting collaborator". Priscilla was interviewed by the House Select Committee on Assassinations in 1978. Interviewer Michael Goldsmith asked her if she had been interviewed by the CIA after her third visit to Russia. She affirmed it, but when Goldsmith showed her a letter from the CIA stating she was cooperating with them on reviews of Russian writers for American publication, she said she did not recall writing it.

== Final years and death ==
McMillan served on the national advisory board of the Council for a Livable World. She was a long-time resident of Cambridge, Massachusetts, and her home there became a locus for intellectual conversations among friends, acquaintances, and family members along the lines of the European salon.

McMillan fell in spring 2021, which led to a decline in her health. The fall, which took place in her home, severely injured her spine and she was not able to regain her mobility. As a result, she was placed into hospice care. She died in her Cambridge home on July 7, 2021, twelve days before her 93rd birthday. Priscilla is buried in Locust Valley Cemetery, Locust Valley, New York.

She appeared posthumously in the 2022 documentary The Assassination & Mrs. Paine. A biography of McMillan is being written by Holly-Katharine Johnson, a niece.

== Works ==
- Khrushchev and the Arts: The Politics of Soviet Culture, 1962–1964 (MIT Press, 1965) [author, co-editor with Leopold Labedz]
- Twenty Letters to a Friend, by Svetlana Alliluyeva (Hutchison, 1967) [translator]
- Marina and Lee: The Tormented Love and Fatal Obsession Behind Lee Harvey Oswald's Assassination of John F. Kennedy (Harper & Row, 1977) (republished Steerforth Press, 2013; ISBN 978-1-58642-216-5)
- The Ruin of J. Robert Oppenheimer and the Birth of the Modern Arms Race (Viking, 2005; ISBN 978-0-14-200115-8)
