= Marguerite Oswald =

Mother of Lee Harvey Oswald (1907–1981)

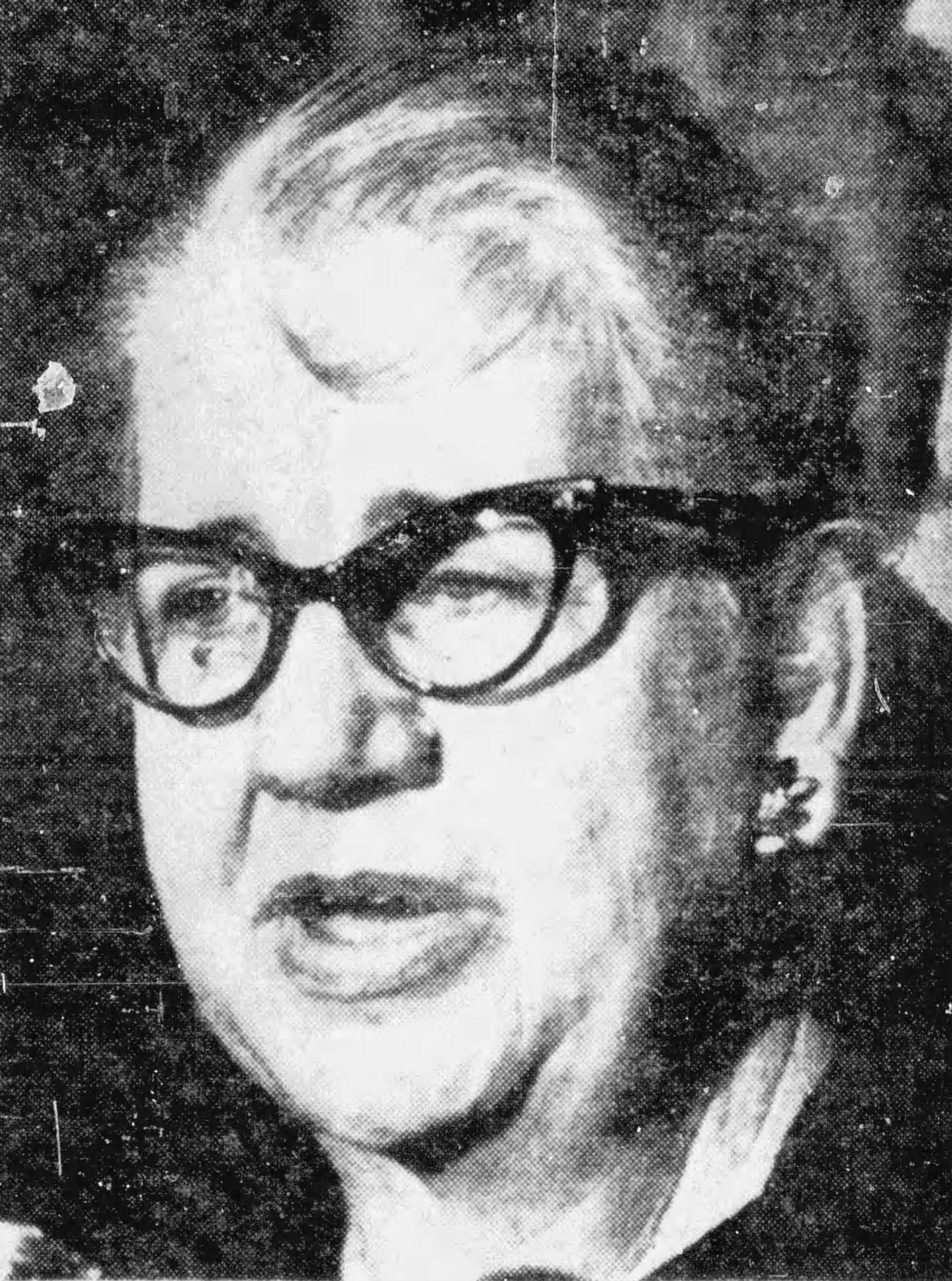
- Oswald in 1964
- Born: Marguerite Frances Claverie; July 19, 1907; New Orleans, Louisiana, U.S.
- Died: January 17, 1981 (aged 73); Fort Worth, Texas, U.S.
- Spouses: Edward John Pic Jr.; (m. 1929; div. 1933); Robert Lee Oswald Sr.; (m. 1933; died 1939); Edwin Albert Ekdahl; (m. 1945; div. 1948)
- Children: 3, including Lee

Marguerite Frances Claverie Oswald Ekdahl (July 19, 1907 – January 17, 1981), also known as Marguerite Oswald, was the mother of Lee Harvey Oswald. After the assassination of John F. Kennedy and her son's murder, Oswald maintained her son's innocence and claimed that he was an agent of the Central Intelligence Agency. She created a shrine in her home to honor his life and military service, and frequently promoted conspiracy theories regarding the assassination. She wrote a booklet titled Aftermath of an Execution: The Burial and Final Rites of Lee Harvey Oswald, which was never published.

== Early life and family ==
=== New Orleans and Dallas ===
Oswald was born Marguerite Frances Claverie in 1907 to John Claverie, whose family were French Catholics, and Dora Stucke, a German Lutheran, a family of French and German descent. In 1911, her mother died, leaving Oswald, her three sisters, and brothers Charles and John in the care of their streetcar conductor father, who raised them on a salary of $90 per month (equivalent to $3,100 in 2025), though he had the help of housekeepers. Oswald's older sister, Lillian Murret, related that their family was poor but happy. Oswald's brothers, Charles and John, both died of tuberculosis as young men. Oswald attended McDonogh High School, but dropped out in her first year. Shortly before she turned 17, she began working at a New Orleans law firm as a receptionist, falsely claiming on her application that she had graduated high school.

In August 1929, while she was still working at the law firm, Oswald married Edward John Pic Jr., a clerk for a stevedoring company. By July 1931, when Oswald was three months pregnant, they had separated, because, according to Pic, of irreconcilable differences, though a salient issue was money, as it would be for Oswald her entire life. Oswald told her family that Pic did not want children, and would not support her. Their son, John Edward Pic, was born on January 17, 1932. Pic supported him until he was 18, though he only saw him occasionally in his first year, and then not again until he was 16. During their separation, Oswald met a friend of Lillian's, a premium collector for Metropolitan Life Insurance Company named Robert Edward Lee Oswald, who was also separated from his wife, when he saw her and infant John coming home from a park.

Marguerite divorced her husband in 1933, by which time Oswald had left his wife, as well. Six months after Robert Edward's divorce, he married Marguerite in a Lutheran church on July 20. Oswald described her marriage to Robert Edward as "the only happy part" of her life. Their first son, Robert Jr., was born April 7, 1934, and though Robert Sr. wanted to adopt John, Marguerite refused this in order to maintain Edward's support payments. On August 19, 1939, little more than a year after the Oswalds bought a house on Alvar Street, and two months before his second son's birth, Robert Lee Oswald died of a heart attack while mowing a lawn on a hot day. On October 18, 1939, the Oswalds' second son, Lee Harvey Oswald, was born at New Orleans' French Hospital. In 1944, Oswald moved her family from New Orleans to Dallas, Texas. She later married Edwin A. Ekdahl that year. They separated in 1946, and formally divorced in 1948. After her second divorce, she became known as Marguerite C. Oswald.

=== Move to New York City ===
In August 1952, Oswald and Lee moved to New York City, where they lived for a short time with her son John Pic, who had served in the Coast Guard before transferring to the Air Force and earning the rank of staff sergeant. At that time, he worked at the Port Security Unit at Ellis Island and lived with his 18-year-old wife Marge and their three-month-old son in an apartment at 325 East 92nd Street. Though John and Marge initially bonded with twelve-year-old Lee, Oswald and Lee's stay there, which the young couple understood to be a visit, was turbulent. This was owing to Oswald's conflict with Marge, and her stated desire to move in with them permanently, one which the couple rejected. During the Oswalds' stay, Lee enrolled in the seventh grade at Trinity Evangelical Lutheran School on Watson Avenue. On September 30, after several weeks of inconsistent attendance, Lee enrolled in P.S. 117, a junior high school in the Bronx, where he was teased by classmates for his regional clothes and accent.

Around this same time, John noticed that Lee's disposition at home changed. No longer well-behaved, he was hostile to him and their mother, and disrespectful of authority. A few days after an incident in which Marge related that Lee threatened her with a pocket knife, the Oswalds moved out of the Pics' apartment, Lee's rapport with the Pics now permanently broken. Oswald found a one-room basement apartment at 1455 Sheridan Avenue, and found a job at Lerner Shops. However, Lee became truant, preferring to stay home to read and watch television over attending school. Because neither his mother nor school authorities were able to compel his return to school, truancy charges were brought against him, stating that he was "beyond the control of his mother insofar as school attendance is concerned." Lee was sent to Youth House, an institution where children underwent psychiatric observation, where he stayed from April 16 to May 7, 1953. Lee was found to exhibit higher-than-normal intelligence for his age, and showed no signs of neurological impairment or mental illness, having scored 118 on an IQ test. However, Chief Psychiatrist Dr. Renatus Hartogs found:

Lee has to be diagnosed as 'personality pattern disturbance with schizoid features and passive—aggressive tendencies.' Lee has to be seen as an emotionally, quite disturbed youngster who suffers under the impact of really existing emotional isolation and deprivation, lack of affection, absence of family life and rejection by a self involved and conflicted mother.

Hartogs recommended that Lee be placed on probation on condition that he seek help and guidance through a child guidance clinic, and that Oswald seek "psychotherapeutic guidance through contact with a family agency." Evelyn D. Siegel, a social worker who interviewed both Lee and Oswald at Youth House, while describing "a rather pleasant, appealing quality about this emotionally starved, affectionless youngster which grows as one speaks to him," found that he had detached himself from the world around him because "no one in it ever met any of his needs for love." Hartogs and Siegel indicated that Oswald gave Lee very little affection, with Siegel concluding that Lee "just felt that his mother never gave a damn for him. He always felt like a burden that she simply just had to tolerate." Furthermore, Oswald did not apparently indicate an awareness of the relationship between her conduct and Lee's psychological problems, with Siegel describing Oswald as a "defensive, rigid, self-involved person who had real difficulty in accepting and relating to people" and who had "little understanding" of Lee's behavior and of the "protective shell he has drawn around himself." Hartogs reported that Oswald did not understand that Lee's withdrawal was a form of "violent but silent protest against his neglect by her and represents his reaction to a complete absence of any real family life." When Lee returned to school for the 1953 Fall semester, his disciplinary problems continued, and when Oswald failed to cooperate with school authorities, they came to consider placing him in a home for boys. This was postponed, perhaps partially because his behavior abruptly improved. Before the New York family court system could address their case, the Oswalds left New York in January 1954, and returned to New Orleans, where Lee finished the ninth grade before he left school to work for a year. In October 1956, he joined the Marines.

== Kennedy assassination ==
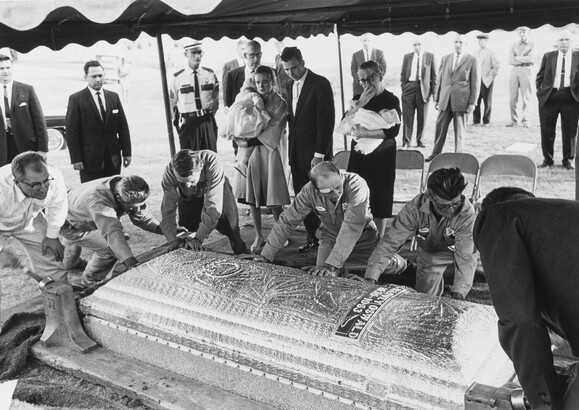
Marguerite Oswald (right, holding child) at Lee's funeral with Lee's brother and Marina Oswald

On November 22, 1963, after Lee had publicly been identified in connection with the assassination of John F. Kennedy, Marguerite Oswald phoned the offices of the Fort Worth Star-Telegram and asked for a ride to Dallas. Bob Schieffer took the call, saying, "Lady, this is not the taxi service and, besides, the president has been shot." After she identified herself as Oswald's mother, Schieffer and another reporter rushed to drive her to Dallas as Schieffer interviewed her. On the afternoon of November 23, Marina and Marguerite talked to Lee. After Lee was murdered by Jack Ruby on November 24, Oswald and Lee's widow Marina asked to go to Parkland Hospital to see his body. In a move that upset Marguerite, Marina opened his eyelids and said, "He cry, he eye wet." Oswald referred to her son's murder as "the tragic event." She also stated to a television camera "my son, even after his death, has done more for his country than any other living human being." After the assassination, Secret Service agent Jerry Parr was assigned to protect Oswald until the completion of her February 1964 testimony before the Warren Commission.

Oswald sought legal representation for her son Lee before the Warren Commission. After she read an article by Mark Lane critiquing the official version of the assassination, she reached out to him. In late December, Lane traveled to Dallas to question Oswald's family and, on January 2, suggested to Mrs. Oswald that she sue the city of Dallas for the death of her son. Lane said: "It would be an attempt to give Lee Oswald in death what he could not obtain in life—a fair trial." Mrs. Oswald announced on January 14 that she had hired Lane to represent her deceased son before the Warren Commission. After Lane notified the Commission that he had been retained by Marguerite Oswald, the Commission's general counsel J. Lee Rankin replied: "The Commission does not believe that it would be useful or desirable to permit an attorney representing Lee Harvey Oswald to have access to the investigative materials within the possession of the Commission or to participate in any hearings to be conducted by the Commission." Although the Commission would soon reverse its position in February when it appointed Walter E. Craig, president of the American Bar Association, to represent Oswald, Lane said that he still considered himself to be Oswald's counsel.

In its 1978 investigation of the assassination, the House Select Committee on Assassinations found that Marguerite Oswald was acquainted with several men associated with lieutenants in Carlos Marcello's organized crime family, including her brother-in-law Charles "Dutz" Murret.

== Later life and death ==
In September 1964, Harold Feldman wrote an article on Oswald, in which he said she was being treated poorly by the media and by the Warren Commission. Feldman described a meeting he and Oswald had with one of witness Helen Markham's sons on June 27, 1964. Feldman said that he, his wife, Marguerite Oswald, and assassination researcher Vincent Salandria visited Markham at her home. On their first visit, they were asked to leave since she did not have time to talk. Her son Bill told them that the Secret Service warned there would be trouble if his mother talked. Returning later, Oswald and the others saw two DPD cars pulling away and Markham pleaded for the visitors to leave. He wrote: "Is Marguerite Oswald 'emotional' and 'unstable,' as the Maedchen fuer Alle of the press say? We spent 5 days in her house and watched her under high pressure. If she is, emotional, then Molly Pitcher was a hysteric. If she is unstable, then Mount Rushmore is putty."

In 1968, Oswald sent a telegram to Coretta Scott King, following Martin Luther King's assassination which Coretta regarded as the telegram that touched her the most. She also expressed shock over the assassination of Robert F. Kennedy. During her later years, she was willing to grant media interviews for compensation. Oswald also charged for her signature and would sell expired licenses and library cards for two hundred dollars each. Sometimes she could be found on Dealey Plaza, selling autographed business cards to tourists for five dollars that stated, "Marguerite Oswald, mother of Lee Harvey Oswald." Gary Mack, curator of the Sixth Floor Museum in Dallas, described her as "a nice lady, and I enjoyed talking to her and answering questions for her, but she was really different...weird as can be". Bob Schieffer called Marguerite Oswald "a self-centered, seriously deranged person, whose only interest seemed to be money". Oswald died of cancer on January 17, 1981, and was buried beside her son Lee at the Shannon Rose Hill Memorial Burial Park in Fort Worth, Texas. Marina, despite having not had any contact with Marguerite for many years, said she was saddened by her death.

== Media ==
Oswald was the subject of a 1966 book by Jean Stafford titled A Mother in History, a profile of Marguerite Oswald. Oswald is a character in the 1988 historical fiction novel Libra by Don DeLillo. In 1997, Dutch filmmaker Theo van Gogh released the film Willem Oltmans, De Eenmotorige Mug (Willem Oltmans, the single-engined mosquito). In the film, journalist Willem Oltmans makes claims about his contacts with George de Mohrenschildt and Oswald. Oswald is featured in the 2013 book by Steven C. Beschloss, The Gunman and his Mother: Lee Harvey Oswald, Marguerite Oswald, and the Making of an Assassin. Oswald was the subject of a 2015 play, Mama's Boy, by Rob Urbinati, which premiered at Good Theater in Portland, Maine featuring Betsy Aidem as Marguerite, and was published by Samuel French in 2017. Oswald is a character in Stephen King's 2011 time travel novel 11/22/63.

=== Portrayals ===
- Bessie Love The Silence of Lee Harvey Oswald (stage adaption)
- Annabelle Weenick (1977) (The Trial of Lee Harvey Oswald)
- Ada Lynn (1991) (JFK)
- Mary Pat Gleason (2013) (Killing Kennedy)
- Jacki Weaver (2013) (Parkland)
- Cherry Jones (2016) (11.22.63)
