= James P. Hosty =

Federal Bureau of Investigation agent

- Born: James Patrick Hosty; August 28, 1924; Chicago, Illinois, US
- Died: June 10, 2011 (aged 86); Kansas City, Missouri, US
- Education: University of Notre Dame
- Years active: 1952–1979
- Employer: Federal Bureau of Investigation
- Known for: Investigation of Lee Harvey Oswald
- Notable work: Assignment: Oswald (memoir)
- Title: Special Agent
- Spouse: Janet
- Children: nine

James Patrick Hosty Jr. (August 28, 1924 – June 10, 2011) was an American FBI agent known for unofficially investigating Lee Harvey Oswald in the months before the 1963 assassination of President John F. Kennedy.

== Early life and education ==
Hosty was born on August 28, 1924, in Chicago, Illinois. He was one of seven children of Charlotte Irene and James Patrick Hosty Sr., an executive in a sugar company in Chicago. Hosty served in the United States military during World War II from 1942 to 1946 and graduated from the University of Notre Dame.

== Career ==
Hosty was involved in the FBI's investigation into author Eustace Mullins in 1959.

Hosty was assigned by FBI Headquarters to investigate ultra-rightists like members of the KKK and General Edwin Walker along with "his [Walker's] Minutemen in Dallas." Hosty himself said so on page 4 of his book Assignment Oswald (1996).

In June 1962, Lee Harvey Oswald was allowed to return to the United States after his 1959 defection to the Soviet Union. He brought with him a wife and his infant daughter, both born in the Soviet Union, and FBI agent John Fain was assigned to investigate him. Fain interviewed Oswald twice – once in June 1962 and once in August 1962. After the second interview, Fain along with FBI Headquarters closed the FBI casefile on Oswald. General Edwin Walker was a well-known anti-communist in his day. Many US anti-communists were outraged that a defector to the Soviet Union would be allowed to return to the Dallas area with a Russian bride. They demanded that the FBI continually investigate Oswald, yet the FBI casefile was officially closed.

In early November 1963, Hosty made contact with Oswald's wife, Marina Oswald, in order to interview her about her entry into the United States 17 months previously. Oswald wrote Hosty a hostile note to protest what he considered harassment of Marina. Oswald also had Hosty's name, phone number, and car license plate number in his address book. A typed list of the book's contents was provided by the FBI to the Warren Commission, however they omitted Hosty's name and details.

Hosty told the Warren Commission the truth about Oswald's hostile letter and he had destroyed it, on his superior's orders. His superior, Gordon Shanklin, denied this. Because of this, Hosty attracted speculation as a possible conspirator in several conspiracy theories.

The Warren Commission attorneys often asked how the FBI could either (1) be unaware of the dangers of Lee Harvey Oswald; or (2) be aware of Oswald's danger and yet fail to warn the Secret Service in Washington DC about this threat to JFK in Dallas. J. Edgar Hoover was asked this question numerous times in his own Warren Commission testimony, with ambiguous replies (which fed different JFK conspiracy theories). After those hearings, Hoover transferred Hosty to the FBI's Kansas City office until his mandatory retirement in 1979.

Hosty later wrote a memoir about the Kennedy assassination, titled Assignment: Oswald.

Hosty received a signed note from Lee Harvey Oswald about two weeks before the Kennedy assassination. The note asked Hosty to stop questioning Oswald's wife. Hosty put the letter in his lockbox and said that "it appeared to be an innocuous type of complaint....It didn't seem to have any need for action at that time". He first met Oswald on November 22, 1963. It was while he was interrogating Oswald on November 22 that he realized that the unsigned note he had received two weeks prior was from Oswald. He said that, on orders from his supervisor, he destroyed the note after Oswald was killed on November 24, 1963. Assistant Director of the FBI, William C. Sullivan, later claimed that it was destroyed on the orders of J. Edgar Hoover, although he qualified that "I can't prove this, but I have no doubts about it".

Notes taken down by Hosty during his interrogation of Oswald on November 22, indicate that when Oswald was asked to account for himself at the time of the assassination, he claimed to have "went outside to watch P. Parade" (referring to the presidential motorcade). The Hosty interrogation notes, unearthed at NARA by former British Intelligence agent and JFK researcher, Malcolm Blunt, were recently featured for the first time in the 2020 NHK World-Japan documentary Oswald and JFK - Unsolved Cases, Part II: The Chessmaster (at 35:00 - 36:10).

== Later life and death ==
Hosty retired from the Federal Bureau of Investigation in 1979.

He died of prostate cancer on June 10, 2011, in Kansas City, Missouri.

== Portrayal in fiction ==
Hosty was portrayed in the 1991 Oliver Stone film JFK as having a central role in a government conspiracy to assassinate Kennedy and frame Oswald. In the 2011 Stephen King novel 11/22/63, Hosty questions the protagonist Jake Epping, a time traveler who has just narrowly prevented Oswald from killing the president. Hosty is suspicious of Epping because of what he knows about Oswald and his investigation by the FBI, but assists Epping in his efforts to quietly disappear, so that he may return to 2011. The television adaptation has Epping returning to 2016, and Gil Bellows briefly appears as Hosty.

Actor Ron Livingston portrays Hosty in writer and director Peter Landesman's 2013 film Parkland, which recounts the subsequent events that occurred at Dallas' Parkland Hospital on the day JFK was assassinated.
