= Parkland (film) =

2013 American film

- Theatrical release poster
- Directed by: Peter Landesman
- Written by: Peter Landesman
- Based on: Four Days in November: The Assassination of President John F. Kennedy by Vincent Bugliosi
- Produced by: Tom Hanks; Gary Goetzman; Bill Paxton; Nigel Sinclair; Matt Jackson
- Starring: James Badge Dale; Zac Efron; Jackie Earle Haley; Tom Welling; Colin Hanks; David Harbour; Marcia Gay Harden; Ron Livingston; Jeremy Strong; Billy Bob Thornton; Jacki Weaver; Paul Giamatti
- Cinematography: Barry Ackroyd
- Edited by: Leo Trombetta; Markus Czyzewski
- Music by: James Newton Howard
- Production companies: Exclusive Media; Playtone; American Film Company; Millennium Entertainment
- Distributed by: Exclusive Media
- Release dates: September 1, 2013 (Venice Film Festival); October 4, 2013 (United States)
- Running time: 93 minutes
- Country: United States
- Language: English
- Budget: $10 million
- Box office: $1.6 million

Parkland is a 2013 American historical drama film that recounts the chaotic events that occurred following the 1963 assassination of John F. Kennedy. The film was written and directed by Peter Landesman, in his directorial debut, and produced by Playtone's Tom Hanks and Gary Goetzman, Bill Paxton, and Exclusive Media's Nigel Sinclair and Matt Jackson. The film is based on Vincent Bugliosi's 2008 book Reclaiming History: The Assassination of President John F. Kennedy.

== Plot ==
On November 22, 1963, United States president John F. Kennedy is making a political trip through Texas with his wife, Jackie, and Vice President Lyndon B. Johnson. Following a speech in Fort Worth, the group flies to Dallas for a motorcade.

Several people begin their days as regular in Dallas: Dr. Jim Carrico, resident surgeon at Parkland Memorial Hospital, wakes and responds to a call; dressmaker Abraham Zapruder giddily arrives to his offices, telling his employees to come downstairs for the motorcade; FBI agent James Hosty talks with his boss, agent Gordon Shanklin; Robert Oswald, brother of Lee Harvey Oswald, enters his office. Kennedy lands at Dallas Love Field with Dallas Secret Service agent-in-charge Forrest Sorrels awaiting. The motorcade departs towards the downtown area.

In Dealey Plaza, Zapruder films the motorcade as it passes through. Suddenly, three gunshots ring out, one fatally striking Kennedy. The motorcade speeds away, leaving a traumatized Zapruder at the scene. Parkland receives the call that Kennedy is coming in, and Head Trauma Nurse Doris Nelson informs Carrico. Once the motorcade arrives, agents attempt to move the unconscious Kennedy into the hospital, but Jackie, in a state of shock, will not allow them to. Meanwhile, Zapruder is approached by Dallas Morning News reporter Harry McCormick and he confirms to McCormick that he filmed the motorcade. Johnson is rushed inside the hospital and into a guarded room, and Kennedy is eventually taken inside into Trauma Room One, where Carrico begins to operate on him. Dr. Malcolm Perry, the Chief Resident, is also rushed into the operating room, where he performs a tracheotomy on the dying president. After Kennedy's life drains further, Carrico orders a priest to Parkland.

After a tip from McCormick, Zapruder is contacted by Sorrels, who adamantly requests his footage. Zapruder is hesitant, but Sorrels insists on the matter of national security, and they depart to the news station to develop the film. At Parkland, Perry begins to administer CPR to Kennedy. The request to process Zapruder's footage is denied by the news station due to it being 8 mm film. Zapruder informs Sorrels of a Kodak lab by Love Field, and the group leaves to go there. Kennedy flatlines, and Carrico begins to desperately continue CPR. However, this proves unsuccessful, and Kennedy is pronounced dead. Jackie sobs over Kennedy's body as the hospital staff, Secret Service agents and priest look on in grief. Following this, Shanklin informs the FBI agents of the president's death. Johnson is also informed of Kennedy's death, and the Secret Service discuss a return to Washington. Kennedy is given the last rites of the Roman Catholic Church, and a coffin is called to Parkland. Robert overhears on the radio that his brother was arrested for killing police officer J. D. Tippit, and is also being considered as a suspect in the assassination, and he leaves his workplace. Hosty informs Shanklin that he's been tracking Lee and contacted his wife, Marina, two weeks prior.

Zapruder, Sorrels, McCormick and the other agents arrive at the Kodak lab, and they process the film. There, the Zapruder film is seen for the first time, and copies of it are ordered. Johnson is rushed out of Parkland, back to Love Field, and onto Air Force One. The coffin arrives and, despite a brief confrontation, Kennedy's body is taken from Parkland towards Love Field. To make room on Air Force One, seats are removed and a wall is broken, and the coffin is ultimately placed inside. There, Johnson takes the presidential oath of office, and the jet leaves for Washington. Robert arrives at the police headquarters, has an appalling conversation with his conspiracist mother, Marguerite, and gets indirectly threatened by an officer to change his name and move as far away from the Dallas area as possible. Shanklin discovers a letter from Lee threatening an attack on the office if the FBI contacts Marina again, and lambasts Hosty for not arresting him then.

Robert is taken into a visiting room with Lee where he attempts to get him to confess to the assassination. Lee denies his involvement. Though extremely angry, Robert promises to get him a lawyer. When Lee tells Robert to stay out of it, he responds by telling him that "you did this to all of us". Lee is taken away, and Robert cries against a door. Late that night, Zapruder hands off his copies of the film to the authorities, and returns to his office where he reluctantly speaks with Life Magazine editor Dick Stolley on the phone, who requests his film. The next morning, Zapruder and Stolley speak, and he ultimately gives Stolley his film under the condition that the fatal shot be hidden from the public in order to protect Kennedy's dignity. Lee is shot on live television by Jack Ruby and is rushed to Parkland, where he is denied entry into Trauma Room One. In another operating room, after treatment by Carrico, Perry and Nelson, Lee ultimately succumbs to his wounds. Robert is dismayed to learn of Lee's death while an unbothered Marguerite insists Lee was a government agent and demands he be buried with Kennedy at Arlington National Cemetery. Hosty is ordered by Shanklin to burn the file on Oswald as it is now irrelevant. Three days after the assassination, both Kennedy and Lee have their funerals, and the Parkland staff, Zapruder, the FBI and the Secret Service somberly return to work.

An epilogue reveals that Robert never left Dallas or changed his name, and has never denied Lee's involvement in the assassination, the exact opposite of Marguerite; Zapruder never escaped his trauma from that day; Carrico led a distinguished career in trauma medicine, eventually becoming president of the American Association for the Surgery of Trauma.

== Cast ==
- James Badge Dale as Robert Edward Lee Oswald Jr.
- Zac Efron as Dr. Charles James "Jim" Carrico
- Jackie Earle Haley as Father Oscar Huber
- Tom Welling as Secret Service Agent Roy Kellerman
- Colin Hanks as Dr. Malcolm O. Perry
- David Harbour as James Gordon Shanklin
- Marcia Gay Harden as Head Nurse Doris Nelson
- Ron Livingston as James P. Hosty
- Jeremy Strong as Lee Harvey Oswald
- Billy Bob Thornton as Secret Service Agent Forrest Sorrels
- Jacki Weaver as Marguerite Oswald
- Paul Giamatti as Abraham Zapruder
- Dana Wheeler-Nicholson as Lillian Zapruder
- Bitsie Tulloch as Marilyn Sitzman
- Brett Stimely as the corpse of President John F. Kennedy
- Kat Steffens as First Lady Jacqueline Kennedy
- Gil Bellows as David Powers
- Sean McGraw as President Lyndon B. Johnson
- Rory Cochrane as Earl Rose
- Mark Duplass as Kenneth O'Donnell
- Jimmie Dale Gilmore as Reverend Saunders
- Matt Barr as Paul Mikkelson
- Jonathan Breck as Winston Lawson
- Gary Grubbs as Dr. Kemp Clark
- Bryan Batt as Malcolm Kilduff
- Glenn Morshower as Mike Howard
- Armando Gutierrez as Officer Glen McBride
- Austin Nichols as Secret Service Agent Emory Roberts
- Gary Clarke as Admiral George Burkley

== Production ==
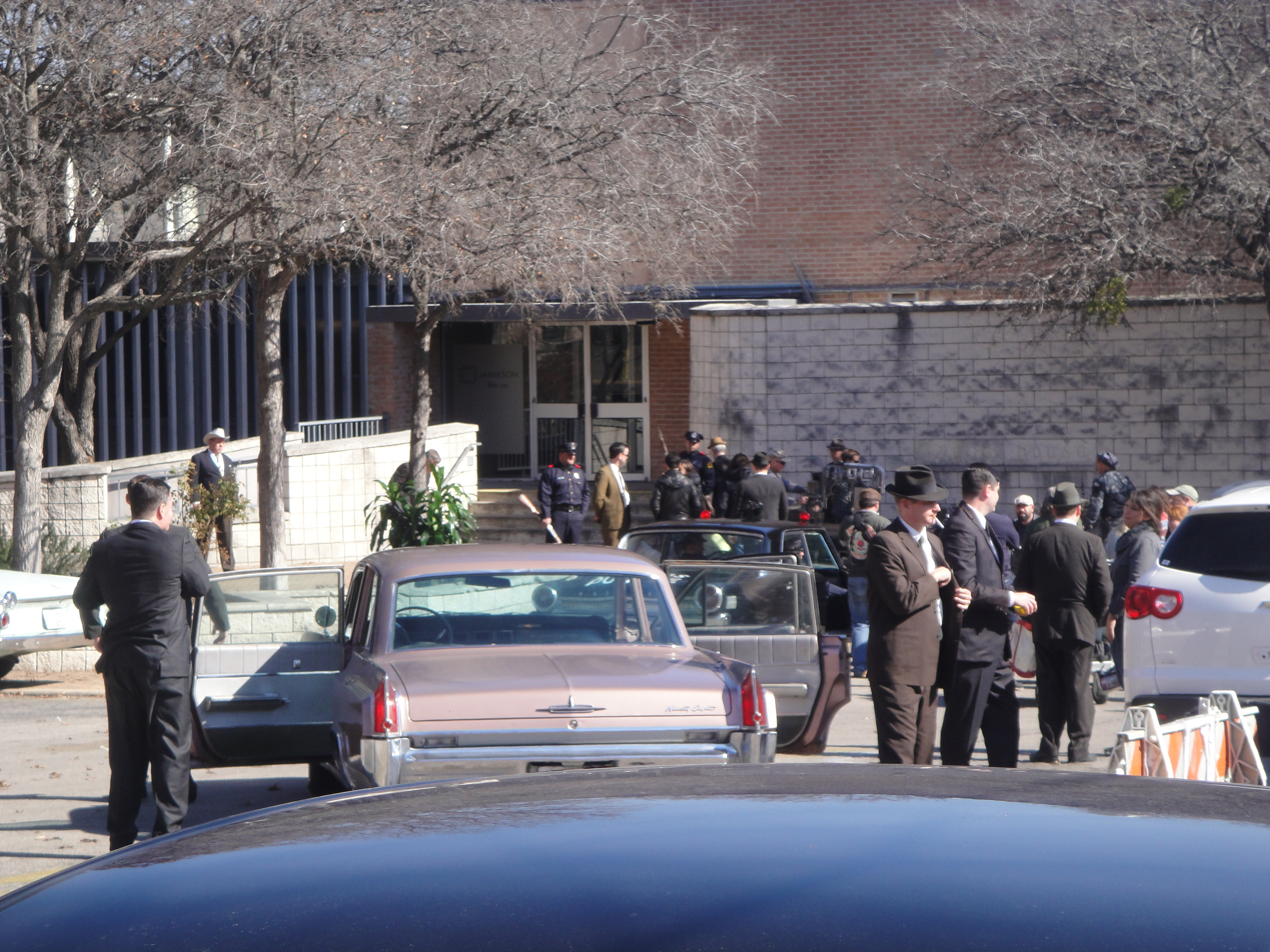
Filming at All Saints Episcopal Church in Austin, Texas

Production began in January 2013 in Austin, Texas. Writer/director Peter Landesman has stated that the film does not explore the various conspiracy theories surrounding the Kennedy assassination.

The major hospital scenes were filmed in a building housed on the campus of Austin State Hospital in Austin, due to the period look and feel of the building.

== Release ==
Parkland premiered at the 70th Venice International Film Festival, and was also screened at the 2013 Toronto International Film Festival. Coinciding with the assassination's 50th anniversary year, the film was released theatrically in the United States on October 4, 2013.

== Reception ==
Parkland received mixed reviews, holding a 51% rating, based on 121 reviews, on review aggregator website Rotten Tomatoes; the consensus states: "Although its decision to look at John F. Kennedy's assassination through uncommon perspectives is refreshing, Parkland never achieves the narrative cohesion its subject deserves." On Metacritic, the film has a 51/100 rating, signifying "mixed or average reviews".

== Home media ==
The film was released on DVD and Blu-ray on November 5, 2013.

== Historical accuracy ==
Historian Peter Ling awarded Parkland four out of five stars for enjoyment and three stars for historical accuracy. Reviewing the film, he praised its attempt to "capture the desperate efforts made to save Kennedy in the operating room." He told historyextra, "It shows that the head nurse, Doris Nelson (played by Marcia Gay Harden), had to take a piece of JFK's skull and some brain tissue from Mrs Kennedy [Jackie picked up a piece of her husband's skull at the scene], and that junior doctor, Jim Carrico (played by Zac Efron), had to be told to stop the frenetic but fruitless cardiac massage at one o'clock, when the team declared JFK dead."

In the same article, he indirectly acknowledges that the film steers clear of the conspiracy theories surrounding the assassination, along with their insinuations and speculations: "Once copies have been given to the Secret Service and the FBI, Zapruder has to choose from many media outlets who want to buy the film. He chooses Life because he says he respects the publication, but the movie seems to hint that any suppression of the film's contents is in line with Zapruder's wishes, and not because of suspect influences at Life itself, whose managing director [C. D. Jackson] had CIA connections."

== See also ==
- Assassination of John F. Kennedy in popular culture
- Killing Kennedy (2013), a made-for-TV film about the same events, also commemorating the 50th anniversary of the JFK assassination.
- Bobby (2006), a film detailing events, some fictional, around the RFK assassination, directed by Emilio Estevez.
