= George de Mohrenschildt =

American geologist and CIA informant (1911–1977)

- Born: Jerzy Sergius von Mohrenschildt; April 17, 1911; Mozyr, Russian Empire
- Died: March 29, 1977 (aged 65); Manalapan, Florida, U.S.
- Education: Institute of Higher Commercial Studies; University of Liège; University of Texas at Austin
- Occupation: Petroleum geologist
- Era: World War II; Cold War
- Employer: OSS
- Known for: Associate of Lee Harvey Oswald
- Spouses: Dorothy Pierson (m. 1942; div. 1944) Phyllis Washington (m. 1947; div. 1949) Wynne Sharples (m. 1951; div. 1956) Jeanne LeGon (m. 1959; div. 1973)
- Children: 3

George Sergius de Mohrenschildt (Note: Russian: Георгий Сергеевич де Мореншильд, romanized: Georgy Sergeyevich de Morenshild) (April 17, 1911 – March 29, 1977) was a Russian-born American petroleum geologist, anti-communist political refugee, professor, and occasional CIA informant. He moved to the Dallas area in October 1961, and befriended Lee Harvey Oswald in the summer of 1962, the year before the assassination of John F. Kennedy. A Russian emigrant who was born into an aristocratic family in Tsarist Russia, he ran in high social circles and was friends with Jacqueline Kennedy, the future wife of the president. While still a young boy, his wealthy family fell victim to the communist revolution, and they fled to Poland. He emigrated to the United States in the late 1930s, where his brother worked for the OSS during World War II.

De Mohrenschildt met Oswald in 1962. By most accounts, he treated Oswald with respect. After the assassination, de Mohrenschildt testified before the Warren Commission investigating the assassination, in which he minimised their relationship; his testimony was one of the longest of any witness.

In March 1977, de Mohrenschildt died by apparent suicide while waiting to testify before the House Select Committee on Assassinations. His different accounts of Oswald at different times and his CIA links had led to several assassination conspiracy theorists to question his relationship with Oswald.

== Life ==
=== Early life ===
De Mohrenschildt was born as Jerzy Sergius von Mohrenschildt in Mozyr, in the Russian Empire (present-day Belarus), on April 17 [O.S. April 4] 1911. He had an older brother, Dimitri. His aristocratic father, Sergey Alexandrovich von Mohrenschildt, was of Baltic German, Swedish, and Russian descent. De Mohrenschildt's mother, Alexandra, was of aristocratic Polish, Russian, and Hungarian descent.

The arms of the von Mohrenschildt family

Sergey von Mohrenschildt was described by his son as the Marshal of Nobility of the Minsk Governorate from 1913 to 1917, and a civil rank of Actual Civil Councilor corresponding to Major General. In 1920, during the Red Terror and the Russian Civil War, Sergey von Mohrenschildt was arrested by the Bolshevik secret police, or CHEKA, for alleged anti-Soviet agitation. He was sentenced to internal exile for life in Veliky Ustyug, a town in the north of Russia. De Mohrenschildt later testified before the Warren Commission that, while awaiting transport to Veliky Ustyug, his father became ill. Two doctors who treated him in jail advised him to stop eating so he would appear more sickly. The doctors then told the Soviet government that Sergey was too ill to survive the trip to Veliky Ustyug and he should be allowed to recover at home. The Soviet Government agreed, under the condition that Sergey check in weekly until he was well enough to be sent to Veliky Ustyug. After his release, Sergey, his wife and the young de Mohrenschildt then fled to the Second Polish Republic in a hay wagon (de Mohrenschildt's older brother Dimitri, who was awaiting execution, was later repatriated to Poland as part of a prisoner exchange). During their journey, de Mohrenschildt, his father and mother Alexandra contracted typhoid fever. Alexandra died of the disease shortly after the family crossed into Poland.

After the death of his wife, Sergey von Mohrenschildt and his sons made their way to Wilno (Vilnius) in Lithuania, where the family owned a six-acre estate. George de Mohrenschildt graduated from the Wilno gymnasium in 1929 and later graduated from the Polish Army's Cavalry Academy in 1931. He went on to earn a master's degree at the Institute of Higher Commercial Studies. Having completed a dissertation on the economic influence of the U.S. on Latin America, he received a doctor of science degree in international commerce from the University of Liège in Belgium in 1938.

George von Mohrenschildt emigrated to the United States in May 1938, after which he legally Gallicised the nobiliary particle in his name from the German "von" to the French "de". According to de Mohrenschildt, he gathered information about people involved in pro-Nazi activities, such as those bidding for US oil leases on behalf of Nazi Germany before the US became involved in World War II. De Mohrenschildt testified that a further purpose of his data collection was to help French petroleum companies outbid the Germans. He said that he was doing this work on behalf of French intelligence, but that he was not a member of French intelligence.

George de Mohrenschildt spent the summer of 1938 with his older brother Dimitri von Mohrenschildt on Long Island, New York. Like George, Dimitri von Mohrenschildt was a staunch anti-communist, who was also an anti-Nazi agent for General William J. Donovan's OSS and, during the Cold War, one of the founders of Radio Free Europe and Radio Liberty.

While in New York, de Mohrenschildt became acquainted with the Bouvier family, including future First Lady of the United States Jacqueline Bouvier. Jacqueline grew up calling de Mohrenschildt "Uncle George" and would often sit on his knee. He became a close friend of Jacqueline's aunt Edith Bouvier Beale.

De Mohrenschildt dabbled in the insurance business from 1939 to 1941, but failed his broker's examination. In 1941, he became associated with Film Facts in New York, a production company owned by his cousin, Berend Maydell, also known as Baron Maydell (or Count Maydell) who allegedly had pro-Nazi sympathies. In 1942, en route to Mexico, de Mohrenschildt was confronted by agents of the US government who accused him of being a Nazi spy. After his car was searched, he was let go and continued on to Mexico. According to a memo by former CIA director Richard Helms, de Mohrenschildt "was alleged to be a Nazi espionage agent." In 1942 de Mohrenschildt applied to join the Office of Strategic Services but his application was rejected on the grounds of this suspicion. George de Mohrenschildt denied ever having Nazi sympathies and claimed instead to have helped raise money in America for the Polish resistance, by making a documentary film about resistance fighters in Occupied Poland.

In 1941, de Mohrenschildt co-founded The Russian Review. In 1942, he married an American teenager named Dorothy Pierson. They had a daughter, Alexandra (known as Alexis) and divorced in early 1944. In 1945, de Mohrenschildt received a master's degree in petroleum geology from the University of Texas.

=== Dallas, Oswald and Haiti ===
After the end of World War II, de Mohrenschildt moved to Venezuela, where he worked for Hampton Industries Oil, a company owned by the family of Preston A. Hampton In 1947, he married Phyllis Washington, the step-daughter of a diplomat with the State Department, S. Walter Washington. They divorced in 1949. That same year, de Mohrenschildt became a naturalized U.S. citizen. In 1950, he launched an oil investment firm with his step-nephew Edward Hooker, with offices in New York City, Denver, and Abilene. In 1951, de Mohrenschildt's third marriage was to the physician Wynne "Didi" Sharples. The following year, the couple settled in Dallas, Texas, where de Mohrenschildt took a job with oilman Clint Murchison as a petroleum geologist. De Mohrenschildt and his third wife had two children, a son and a daughter, both of whom were born with cystic fibrosis (the couple's son died of the disease in 1960, as did their daughter in 1973). De Mohrenschildt and Sharples were divorced in 1957.

De Mohrenschildt joined the Dallas Petroleum Club, was a member of the Dallas Council on World Affairs, and taught at a local college. One of his longtime friends, offshore oil engineer George Kitchel, told the FBI that de Mohrenschildt counted among his good friends oil barons Clint Murchison, H.L. Hunt, John W. Mecom Sr., and Sid Richardson. De Mohrenschildt also joined the right-wing Texas Crusade for Freedom, whose members included Earle Cabell, Everette DeGolyer, David Harold Byrd and Ted Dealey.

In 1957, de Mohrenschildt went to Communist Yugoslavia to conduct a geological field survey for the U.S. State Department-sponsored International Cooperation Administration. While in Yugoslavia, de Mohrenschildt was accused by the secret police, or UDBA, of making drawings of military fortifications. After returning to the United States, de Mohrenschildt was debriefed by the CIA, both in Washington and in Dallas. The following year he travelled to Mexico and Panama where he produced further intelligence reports for the CIA.

Following his divorce in 1957, de Mohrenschildt married his fourth wife, former dancer, model, and fellow Russian-American Jeanne LeGon, in June 1959. LeGon (née Eugenia Fomenko) was the daughter of a director of the Chinese Far East Railway who was later killed by communists. (Note: Jeanne LeGon had a daughter named Jeanne Elinor LeGon.) From late 1960 and into 1961, he and his wife toured Central America and the Caribbean. His "walking trip" through Central America was made to recover from the grief of losing his only son in 1960 to cystic fibrosis. However, de Mohrenschildt also submitted a written report of his trip to the U.S. State Department, and a photograph taken during the trip shows him meeting the American ambassador to Costa Rica.

Lee Harvey Oswald and his Soviet-born wife Marina Oswald were introduced to de Mohrenschildt in the summer of 1962 in Fort Worth, Texas. De Mohrenschildt testified before the Warren Commission in 1964 that he met the Oswalds through a prominent member of Fort Worth's Russian-American community, oil accountant George Bouhe. When de Mohrenschildt asked whether it was safe to help Oswald, Bouhe said that he had checked with the FBI. De Mohrenschildt also believed that he had discussed Oswald with Max Clark, who he believed worked for the FBI, and with J. Walton Moore, whom de Mohrenschildt described as "a Government man — either FBI or Central Intelligence", and who had debriefed de Mohrenschildt several times following his travels abroad, starting in 1957. (According to a declassified CIA document, obtained by the House Select Committee on Assassinations, de Mohrenschildt was in fact correct and J. Walton Moore was an agent of the CIA's Domestic Contacts Division in Dallas.) De Mohrenschildt asserted that, shortly after meeting Oswald, he had asked Moore and Fort Worth attorney Max E. Clark about Oswald to reassure himself that it was "safe" to assist Oswald. De Mohrenschildt testified that one of the persons with whom he had discussed Oswald told him that Oswald "seems to be OK," and that "he is a harmless lunatic." However, he was no longer sure who had told him that. (When interviewed in 1978 by the House Select Committee on Assassinations, J. Walton Moore said that while he "had 'periodic' contact with de Mohrenschildt", he had no recollection of any conversation with him concerning Oswald. After returning home from a weekend trip to Houston, de Mohrenschildt became aware that someone had broken into his home and copied his personal papers and other documents. At the time, he also had a manuscript that Oswald had given him to read, and realized that the document might also have been photocopied in the search. His primary concern was that the CIA was behind the break-in. According to de Mohrenschildt, Moore flatly denied when confronted that the CIA was involved in any way.

In October 1962, Oswald informed de Mohrenschildt that he had lost his job in nearby Fort Worth. In response, de Mohrenschildt advised Oswald that he would have a better chance of finding work in Dallas. Oswald was soon hired by the Dallas photographic firm of Jaggars-Chiles-Stovall. De Mohrenschildt's wife and daughter would later say that it had been he who had secured the job at Jaggars-Chiles-Stovall for Oswald.

On April 14, 1963, de Mohrenschildt and his wife Jeanne claimed that during a visit to the Oswalds' Dallas apartment, while Marina was showing Jeanne around the apartment, they discovered a rifle leaning against the wall inside a closet; Jeanne told George that Oswald had a rifle, and George joked to Oswald, "Were you the one who took a pot-shot at General Walker?" (General Edwin Walker was a politician whom de Mohrenschildt "knew that Oswald disliked.") When asked by the Warren Commission about Oswald's reaction, de Mohrenschildt replied that Oswald "smiled at that". In an interview with Edward Jay Epstein, de Mohrenschildt claimed to have told the CIA that he believed Oswald had attempted to murder General Walker. "I spoke to the CIA both before and afterwards. It was what ruined me." The Warren Commission concluded that on April 10, 1963, Oswald had attempted to murder General Edwin Walker.

In April 1963, de Mohrenschildt moved to Haiti. Here he tried to strike a deal with the government of President Francois "Papa Doc" Duvalier for mineral and oil exploration. From 1964 till 1966 mail addressed to de Mohrenschildt was under surveillance, being opened and photographed by the U.S. Embassy in Haiti.

Following the assassination of Kennedy and murder of Oswald in November 1963, de Mohrenschildt testified before the Warren Commission in April 1964 and minimised his relationship with Oswald. He and his wife said they had the impression Oswald admired Kennedy. According to Colonel L. Fletcher Prouty, then chief Pentagon-to-CIA liaison officer, de Mohrenschildt also had several private lunches with former CIA director and Warren Commission member Allen Dulles while testifying. In November 1966, de Mohrenschildt left Haiti and returned to Dallas. During 1967, Orleans Parish District Attorney Jim Garrison interviewed de Mohrenschildt and his wife as part of Garrison's prosecution of Clay Shaw. Garrison said that both of the de Mohrenschildts insisted that Oswald had been the scapegoat in the assassination. Garrison concluded from his conversation with them that George de Mohrenschildt had been one of Oswald's unwitting "baby-sitters ... assigned to protect or otherwise see to the general welfare of Oswald."

=== Later life, and letter to CIA director ===
George and Jeanne de Mohrenschildt obtained a divorce in Dallas, Texas on April 3, 1973, after nearly 14 years of marriage. It was not reported in the local newspapers, and the couple continued to present themselves as husband and wife. (Note: For example, from the death investigation report by Thomas Neighbors of the Palm Beach County Sheriff's Office: At 2315 hours, on 29 March 1977, this writer made contact with the victim's wife, MRS. JEANNE de MOHRENSCHILDT, in California ... and advised her of her husband's demise; a fact which she had already been made aware of by several newsmen who had telephoned her seeking a story. She stated that she has been married to the victim for the past twenty-one years and noted that over the past several years he has been acting in an "insane manner.")

On September 17, 1976, the CIA requested that the FBI locate de Mohrenschildt, because he had "attempted to get in touch with the CIA Director." On September 5, 1976, de Mohrenschildt had written a letter to the director of the CIA, George H. W. Bush, asking for his assistance. He was acquainted with the Bush family; George H.W. Bush had roomed with de Mohrenschildt's nephew, Edward G. Hooker, at Phillips Academy in Andover, Massachusetts. The letter said:

You will excuse this hand-written letter. Maybe you will be able to bring a solution to the hopeless situation I find myself in. My wife and I find ourselves surrounded by some vigilantes; our phone bugged; and we are being followed everywhere. Either FBI is involved in this or they do not want to accept my complaints. We are driven to insanity by the situation. I have been behaving like a damn fool ever since my daughter Nadya died from [cystic fibrosis] over three years ago. I tried to write, stupidly and unsuccessfully, about Lee H Oswald and must have angered a lot of people — I do not know. But to punish an elderly man like myself and my highly nervous and sick wife is really too much. Could you do something to remove the net around us? This will be my last request for help and I will not annoy you any more. Good luck in your important job. Thank you so much.

George H. W. Bush responded:

Let me say first that I know it must have been difficult for you to seek my help in the situation outlined in your letter. I believe I can appreciate your state of mind in view of your daughter's tragic death a few years ago, and the current poor state of your wife's health. I was extremely sorry to hear of these circumstances. In your situation I can well imagine how the attentions you described in your letter affect both you and your wife. However, my staff has been unable to find any indication of interest in your activities on the part of Federal authorities in recent years. The flurry of interest that attended your testimony before the Warren Commission has long subsided. I can only speculate that you may have become "newsworthy" again in view of the renewed interest in the Kennedy assassination, and thus may be attracting the attention of people in the media. I hope this letter had been of some comfort to you, George, although I realize I am unable to answer your question completely.

— George Bush, Director of Central Intelligence. [CIA Exec Reg. # 76,51571 9.28.76] (Note: George H. W. Bush recalled, "I first met De Mohrenschildt in the early 1940s. He was an uncle to my Andover roommate." (The relationship would technically be "step-uncle" as the roommate, Edward G. Hooker, was actually Dimitri von Mohrenschildt's stepson).)

On November 9, 1976, Jeanne had de Mohrenschildt committed to a mental institution in Texas for three months, and listed in a notarized affidavit four previous suicide attempts while he was in the Dallas area. In the affidavit, she stated that de Mohrenschildt suffered from depression, heard voices, saw visions, and believed that the CIA and the Jewish Mafia were persecuting him. However, he was released at the end of the year.

=== Visit to Europe ===
According to the Dutch journalist Willem Oltmans, in 1967 a "serious and famous Dutch clairvoyant" named Gerard Croiset had a vision of a conspirator who had manipulated Oswald; his description led Oltmans to de Mohrenschildt, and the two stayed in touch. In 1977, Oltmans went to Texas and brought de Mohrenschildt to the Netherlands. Oltmans claimed that he had rescued de Mohrenschildt from a mental institution to bring him to Croiset. According to Oltmans, Croiset agreed that de Mohrenschildt was the man whom he had seen in his vision.

Oltmans says that after de Mohrenschildt arrived in the Netherlands, he invited him out with some Russian friends. They went to Brussels and had plans to go to Liège in Belgium, where de Mohrenschildt had studied in the 1930s. Oltmans owned a house in the countryside not far from Liège. Upon returning to Brussels, de Mohrenschildt went for a short walk from which he failed to return. He had earlier agreed to meet Oltmans and his friends for lunch. Oltmans waited for him but he did not come back.

=== Death ===
On March 16, 1977, de Mohrenschildt returned to the United States from his trip. His daughter talked with him at length and found him to be deeply disturbed about certain matters, reporting that he had expressed a desire to kill himself. On March 29, de Mohrenschildt gave an interview to author Edward Jay Epstein, during which he claimed that in 1962, Dallas CIA operative J. Walton Moore and one of Moore's associates had handed him the address of Oswald in nearby Fort Worth and then suggested that de Mohrenschildt might like to meet him. He suggested to Moore that he would appreciate some help from the U.S. Embassy in Haiti. "I would never have contacted Oswald in a million years if Moore had not sanctioned it", de Mohrenschildt said. "Too much was at stake." On the same day as the Epstein interview, de Mohrenschildt received a business card from Gaeton Fonzi, an investigator for the House Select Committee on Assassinations, telling him that he would like to see him. The HSCA considered him a "crucial witness". That afternoon, de Mohrenschildt was found dead from a shotgun wound to the head in a house at which he was staying in Manalapan, Florida. The police stated that he had left no suicide note. The coroner's verdict was suicide.

In his book Killing Kennedy (2012), television personality Bill O'Reilly claimed he had been knocking on de Mohrenschildt's front door when he heard a shotgun blast that marked the suicide. This claim was proven false; a contemporaneous phone call recording between O'Reilly and Fonzi confirmed that O'Reilly had been investigating the Russian immigrant, but O'Reilly learned of de Mohrenschildt's suicide from Fonzi and was not even in Florida at the time, but was in Dallas, Texas.

== After the Kennedy assassination ==
=== House Select Committee on Assassinations ===
On April 2, 1977, Willem Oltmans told the House Select Committee on Assassinations that de Mohrenschildt had implicated himself in the conspiracy to kill President Kennedy. And Pat S. Russell, who was de Mohrenschildt's attorney, said "I definitely feel there was a conspiracy and that definitely was the opinion of George." Oltmans testified for three hours behind closed doors and told the committee that de Mohrenschildt had told him that he had discussed all aspects of the assassination with Oswald. "De Mohrenschildt told me that Oswald acted at his (de Mohrenschildt's) instructions and that he knew Oswald was going to kill Kennedy," Oltmans said.

On July 6, 1978, Joseph Dryer told the HSCA that he and de Mohrenschildt were associated with a woman named Jacqueline Lancelot. Dryer's relationship with Lancelot included passing messages for her to people in the United States whom Dryer assumed were connected in some way to the CIA. Dryer said that Lancelot had told him shortly after the assassination that a "substantial" sum of money, $200,000 or $250,000, had been deposited in de Mohrenschildt's account. Dryer said that de Mohrenschildt had claimed that he had come to Haiti to scout for oil, but Dryer stated that "I could never figure out what he did." Dryer expressed the belief that de Mohrenschildt had "some intelligence connection."

Congressional researcher Gaeton Fonzi noted that in late 1963 "several large deposits popped up in de Mohrenschildt's Haitian bank account including one for two hundred thousand dollars from a Bahamian bank." This occurred when de Mohrenschildt and Clemard Joseph Charles, an advisor to Haitian president Francois "Papa Doc" Duvalier, "were 'supposedly' running a sisal plantation, a derelict operation they never went near."

In a 1976 CIA internal memo regarding de Mohrenschildt, Director George H. W. Bush stated: "At one time he had/or spent plenty of money."

=== Another backyard photo ===
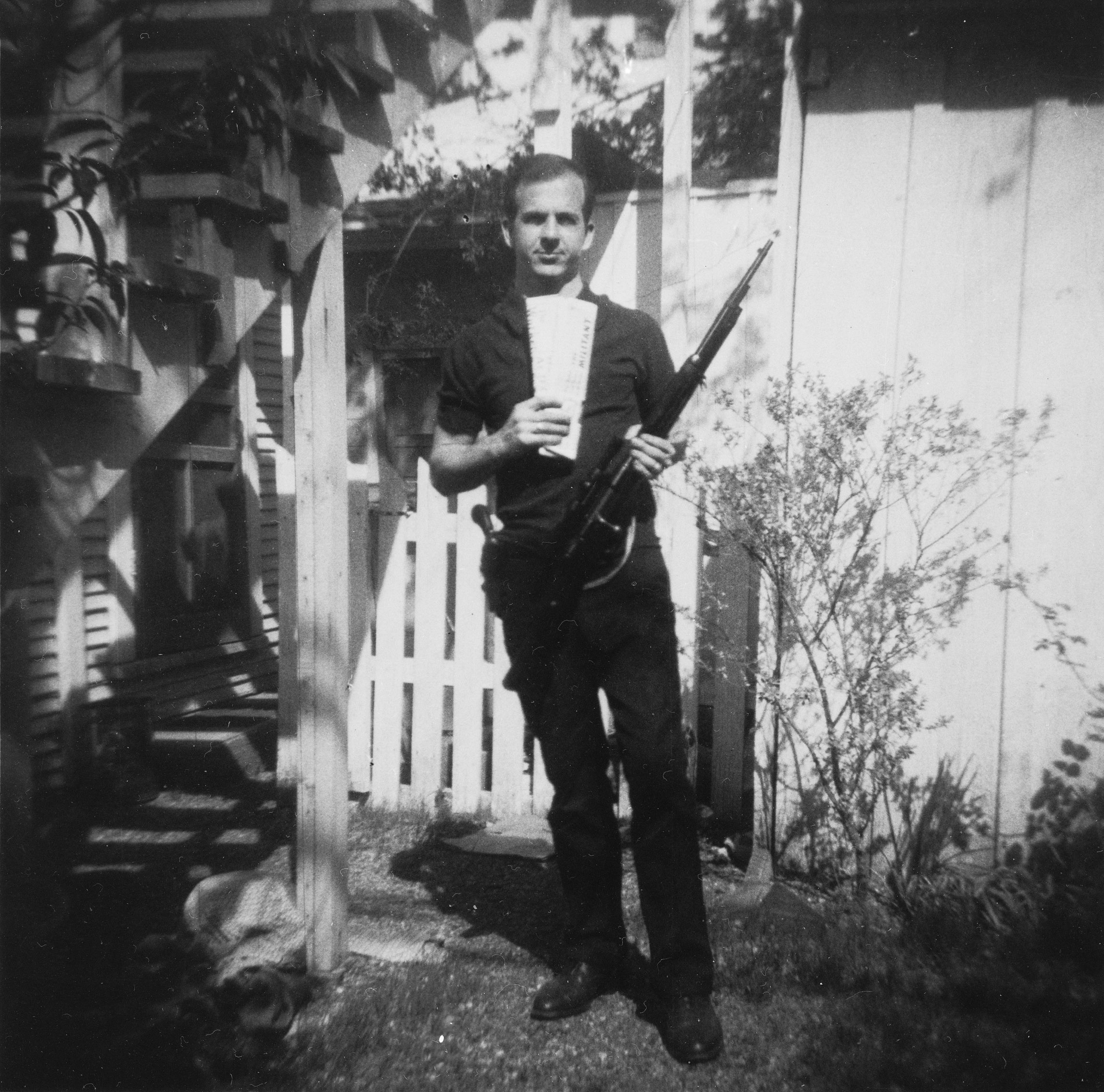
Image CE-133A, one of three known "backyard photos". This is the same image sent by Oswald (as a first generation copy) to his friend George de Mohrenschildt in April 1963, dated and signed by Oswald on the back of the photo. In the image, Oswald holds a Carcano rifle in one hand, with markings which have been matched to the Carcano rifle that was found in the book depository and used in the assassination. Furthermore he holds two Marxist newspapers in the other hand: The Worker, which was Marxist-Leninist and pro-Soviet, and The Militant, a Trotskyist newspaper which followed an anti-Stalinist and anti-Soviet line.

On April 1, 1977, Jeanne de Mohrenschildt gave the House Select Committee on Assassinations a print of a photograph showing Lee Harvey Oswald standing in his Dallas backyard holding two newspapers and a rifle, and with a pistol on his hip – a photograph taken by Oswald's wife Marina. While similar to other prints that had been found among Oswald's effects on November 23, 1963, the existence of this particular print was previously unknown. On the back was written "To my friend George from Lee Oswald" and the date "5/IV/63" (April 5, 1963), along with the words "Copyright Geo de M" and a Russian phrase translated as "'Hunter after fascists, ha-ha-ha!!!" Handwriting specialists later concluded that the words "To my friend George ..." and Oswald's signature were written by Lee Harvey Oswald, but could not determine whether the rest was the writing of Oswald, his wife, or de Mohrenschildt. De Mohrenschildt assumed that Marina had written it sarcastically.

De Mohrenschildt wrote in his manuscript that he had missed Oswald's photograph in packing for the move to Haiti in May 1963, which was why he had not mentioned it to the Warren Commission (though he had noted in his manuscript that Oswald had a rifle in April 1963, and scoffed to Oswald that he had missed General Walker, remembering that Oswald had blanched at the joke). According to de Mohrenschildt, the photograph was not found among his stored papers until he and his wife found it in February 1967. When analyzed by the HSCA in 1977, this photo turned out to be a first-generation print of the backyard photo already known to the Warren Commission as "CE-133A" and which had probably been taken on March 31, 1963.

== Memoir ==
Jeanne de Mohrenschildt also gave the HSCA a copy of a draft manuscript called I Am a Patsy! I Am a Patsy!, which George de Mohrenschildt had completed in the summer of 1976 about his relationship with his "dear, dead friend" Oswald. In the manuscript, he said that the Oswald he knew was rarely ever violent, and would not have been the sort of person to have killed Kennedy. In part, this judgment was based on de Mohrenschildt's estimation of Oswald's political views and Kennedy's liberal ideas. Until 2014 the memoir had never been published as a standalone book, but the entire typescript was published as an appendix in the HSCA report.

The primary focus of de Mohrenschildt's text is a series of recollections about the brief time period between September 1962 and April 1963 when he and his wife were acquainted with the Oswalds. A secondary focus consists of a number of meditations on the corrosive effects the Oswalds had on the professional and personal lives of the de Mohrenschildts. "It must be acknowledged that our brief friendship with the Oswalds had strange and adverse effects on our lives." The manuscript is less concerned with Oswald's guilt or innocence than with suggesting who the real criminals might be. Stating that Oswald was a "patsy not involved in any revenge", and referencing articles describing "organized murder for profit", de Mohrenschildt challenges readers to make up their own minds. De Mohrenschildt's manuscript was edited and annotated as Lee Harvey Oswald as I Knew Him by Michael A. Rinella. It was released in November 2014 by the University Press of Kansas.

== In media ==
Fictional depictions of de Mohrenschildt in literature include:

- The 1988 novel Libra, which portrays the assassination as a conspiracy.
- His Haitian experience is depicted in Hans Christoph Buch's novel Haïti Chérie (Suhrkamp, 1990).
- He appears as a character in Billy Bat, a manga series published from 2008 to 2016
- He serves as a character in the Stephen King novel 11/22/63, a time-travel novel which has Lee Harvey Oswald acting alone to kill JFK.

De Mohrenschildt has been portrayed by:

- Willem Oltmans, the Dutch journalist who befriended him in the late 1960s, in the 1991 film JFK
- Bill Bolender in the 1993 TV movie Fatal Deception: Mrs. Lee Harvey Oswald
- Demosthenes Chrysan in the 2013 film Killing Kennedy
- Jonny Coyne in 11.22.63, a miniseries adaptation of Stephen King's novel.

In 1997, Dutch filmmaker Theo van Gogh released the film Willem Oltmans, De Eenmotorige Mug (Willem Oltmans, the single-engined mosquito), in which journalist Willem Oltmans makes claims about his contacts with de Mohrenschildt (and Oswald's mother, Marguerite Oswald) until de Mohrenschildt's death in 1977.
