= 11.22.63 =

2016 American thriller miniseries

- Genre: Drama; Mystery; Science fiction; Thriller
- Based on: 11/22/63 by Stephen King
- Developed by: Bridget Carpenter
- Starring: James Franco; Sarah Gadon; Cherry Jones; Lucy Fry; George MacKay; Daniel Webber; T. R. Knight; Kevin J. O'Connor; Josh Duhamel; Chris Cooper
- Theme music composer: J. J. Abrams
- Composer: Alex Heffes
- Country of origin: United States
- Original language: English
- No. of episodes: 8

Production
- Executive producers: Kevin Macdonald; Bryan Burk; Bridget Carpenter; Stephen King; J. J. Abrams
- Producers: Joseph Boccia; James Franco
- Cinematography: David Katznelson
- Editor: Dorian Harris
- Running time: 44–81 minutes
- Production companies: Carpenter B.; Bad Robot; Warner Bros. Television

Original release
- Network: Hulu
- Release: February 15 – April 4, 2016

11.22.63 is an American science fiction thriller television miniseries based on the 2011 novel 11/22/63 by Stephen King, and consisting of eight episodes, in which a time traveler (portrayed by James Franco) attempts to stop the assassination of John F. Kennedy. The series was developed by Bridget Carpenter, who also executive produced along with J. J. Abrams, King, and Bryan Burk. It premiered on Hulu on February 15, 2016, and was received positively by critics.

== Premise ==
Jake Epping, a recently divorced English teacher from Lisbon, Maine, is presented with the chance to travel back in time to 1960 by his long-time friend Al Templeton. He is persuaded into going in an attempt to prevent the assassination of United States President John F. Kennedy on November 22, 1963; however, he becomes attached to the life he makes in the past, which could be the mission's undoing. He must find a way to secretly gather information about people and events leading up to the assassination while also creating and maintaining a new life to avoid suspicion.

== Cast and characters ==
=== Main ===
- James Franco as Jake Epping / Jake Amberson
- Chris Cooper as Al Templeton
- Sarah Gadon as Sadie Dunhill
- Lucy Fry as Marina Oswald
- George MacKay as Bill Turcotte
- Daniel Webber as Lee Harvey Oswald

=== Recurring and guest ===
- Cherry Jones as Marguerite Oswald
- Kevin J. O'Connor as the Yellow Card Man
- T. R. Knight as Johnny Clayton
- Josh Duhamel as Frank Dunning
- Joanna Douglas as Doris Dunning
- Nick Searcy as Deke Simmons
- Jonny Coyne as George de Mohrenschildt
- Tonya Pinkins as Mimi Corcoran
- Brooklyn Sudano as Christy Epping
- Leon Rippy as Harry Dunning
- Jack Fulton as Young Harry Dunning
- Juliette Angelo as Bobbi Jill Allnut
- Braeden Lemasters as Mike Coslaw
- Anthony Colonello as Clifford
- Gregory North as General Edwin Walker
- Gil Bellows as Agent Hosty
- Grantham Coleman as Bonnie Ray Williams
- Michael O'Neill as Arliss Price
- Annette O'Toole as Edna Price
- Antoni Corone as Jack Ruby
- Bob Stephenson as Silent Mike
- Wilbur Fitzgerald as Captain Will Fritz
- Constance Towers as Old Sadie
- Kelly McCormack as Dawn

== Episodes ==
No.	Title	Directed by	Written by	Original release date	Prod. code
1	"The Rabbit Hole"	Kevin Macdonald	Bridget Carpenter	February 15, 2016	4X6451
1	"The Rabbit Hole"	Kevin Macdonald	Bridget Carpenter	February 15, 2016	4X6452
In 2016, diner owner Al Templeton reveals a time portal to October 21, 1960, in his diner pantry to his friend, English teacher Jake Epping. Dying of cancer, Al asks Jake to travel back to the 1960s and prevent the assassination of United States President John F. Kennedy. Al explains his own past attempts and mistakes to Jake to stop it, noting his apparent onset of cancer prevented him from spending extended time in the past. Disregarding the warnings from a strange man with a yellow card, and armed with Al's research, Jake goes to 1960 (under the name James Amberson) and surveils a Kennedy intimate, believed to be Lee Harvey Oswald's handler. He finds that the past is "pushing back" as accidents and incidents make it difficult for him to achieve his goals. He returns to his lodgings to find them burning, Al's notes nearly all destroyed, and the landlady's son dead. He decides to give up, and "return to Maine", but stops to try to prevent a multiple murder he had heard about in the present.
2	"The Kill Floor"	Fred Toye	Quinton Peeples	February 22, 2016	4X6453
In Holden, Kentucky, Jake watches over the family of Harry Dunning, his night school student in 2016 whose father Frank murdered the rest of his family on Halloween night in 1960. He encounters bartender Bill Turcotte and Frank, an abusive alcoholic, who later beats Jake after suspecting him of seducing his ex-wife. Jake becomes seriously ill on Halloween, which he attributes to the past pushing back. Bill confronts Jake outside the Dunning household and reveals that Frank had previously killed Bill’s sister and her baby when Bill was a child. Delayed by Bill, Jake engages in a brutal fight with Frank before strangling him to death, saving Harry’s family. Leaving Holden, Jake is confronted at gunpoint by Bill with a news clipping of Kennedy’s assassination.
3	"Other Voices, Other Rooms"	James Strong	Brian Nelson	February 29, 2016	4X6454
Jake takes Bill on a walking tour of Dealey Plaza, sharing an outline of the future events. Jake moves to Fort Worth and finds a job at a school in the nearby small town of Jodie, where he forms a connection with a librarian, Sadie Dunhill. Jake and Bill surveil Lee Harvey Oswald, who has just returned from Russia. Bill insists on experiencing the night life of Dallas, and they unintentionally encounter Jack Ruby as the owner of a strip club. Bill is talkative when drunk, and Jack tries to cultivate a more serious behavior the next morning. Jake purchases wireless microphones and tape recording equipment. Jake is clumsy in both his school relationship with Sadie and the installation of the microphones.
4	"The Eyes of Texas"	Fred Toye	Quinton Peeples & Bridgette Wilson	March 7, 2016	4X6455
In March 1963, Oswald drills assembling his Carcano rifle and takes his infamous picture with it. Jake is confronted by school secretary Miss Mimi after she discovers the falsehoods in his background, causing Jake to spin a Godfather-tinged tale of being in witness protection. Bill introduces himself to Oswald’s wife Marina. Jake and Sadie, now in a relationship, travel to a lovers’ motel, where Jake is unnerved to receive surveillance photos of the couple. Jake and Bill follow Oswald and de Mohrenschildt to a brothel and are caught up in a police raid. Jake learns of Sadie's abusive ex-husband, Johnny Clayton, who raped her on their wedding night and now refuses to finalize their divorce. While tailing de Mohrenschildt, Jake threatens Clayton after learning he was responsible for the photos. Bill comforts Marina after Oswald abuses her. Sadie discovers recordings of Oswald in Jake’s basement.
5	"The Truth"	James Franco	Joe Henderson	March 14, 2016	4X6456
Jake lies to Sadie about the recordings, who does not believe him. After his arrest in the brothel raid and Sadie’s discovery, Jake is pressured into resigning his teaching position. Jake and Bill prepare to observe if Oswald acted alone in trying to assassinate Walker. Clayton calls Jake to Sadie’s house, holding Jake at gunpoint while he mutilates Sadie’s face, and threatens to kill her unless Jake drinks a glass of bleach to kill himself. Bill shares a cigarette with Marina and briefly introduces himself to Oswald. Jake blinds Clayton with the glass of bleach before he and Sadie kill him. Sadie is taken to Parkland Hospital to treat her facial wounds. Forced to observe Oswald alone, Bill is distracted by a vision of his sister and misses the shooting. Visiting Sadie after her surgery, Jake admits the truth about who he is and where he is from.
6	"Happy Birthday, Lee Harvey Oswald"	John David Coles	Bridget Carpenter	March 21, 2016	4X6457
In October 1963, Oswald gets a job at the Texas School Book Depository and is accosted by FBI agent James P. Hosty. To help pay for Sadie’s surgery to fix her scars, Jake places a large bet on a boxing match. He returns to Dallas to discover Bill attending Oswald’s birthday party, learning to his horror that Bill has become intimately involved with Marina. During the party, Bill reveals to Oswald that his apartment is bugged. Jake spots a strange man at the hospital and stops Sadie’s surgery before she is administered a fatal amount of nitrous oxide. After witnessing Bill admiring Oswald’s rifle and concerned he might be the “second shooter,” Jake tricks him into being temporarily committed. Jake threatens de Mohrenschildt and learns that Oswald was rejected for use by de Mohrenschildt’s CIA handlers. With confirmation that Oswald acted alone, Jake decides to kill Oswald. He proposes to Sadie and asks her to return to the future with him. Before he can move on Oswald, Jake is brutally beaten by his bookie.
7	"Soldier Boy"	James Kent	Bridget Carpenter & Quinton Peeples	March 28, 2016	4X6458
Jake wakes from a coma 17 days before the assassination date, suffering from amnesia. Sadie tries to help him as he struggles to remember what to do. Eventually recalling he committed Bill, Jake and Sadie visit Bill in the hopes it will jog Jake’s memory. Addled by electroshock therapy and Jake’s insistence that their mission was real, Bill jumps out a window to his death. Angered by FBI harassment and his separation from Marina, Oswald learns of Kennedy’s impending visit and route four days before the assassination. Listening to Sadie and Deke dance the Madison, Jake remembers his Dallas address and fully recalls his mission after he and Sadie question Oswald. They visit Ruth Paine’s home in an attempt to take Oswald’s rifle but can't find it. While waiting near Dealey Plaza to intercept Oswald, Jake has another vision of the Yellow Card Man, who warns him against trying to change history. Jake asks Sadie to walk away and make a life with him in Jodie, but she urges him to complete his mission. As they rush to the Book Depository, Oswald prepares for Kennedy’s arrival.
8	"The Day in Question"	James Strong	Bridget Carpenter	April 4, 2016	4X6459
During the events of November 22, 1963, Jake and Sadie struggle against the past on their way to the final confrontation with Oswald. Jake stops Oswald but during the scuffle, Sadie is killed. Jake travels back to 2016 only to find it has become a wasteland. Through Harry Dunning, he learns that after JFK served two terms, Alabama governor and segregationist George Wallace was elected president. War broke out with the Soviet Union, and although Kennedy founded a series of refugee camps, there is great suffering in the world. A resigned Jake travels back to October 1960, thus resetting the timeline, where he immediately meets Sadie again, but in order to save her life decides not to pursue a relationship. In the present, Jake travels back to Jodie and finds Sadie in her 80s receiving a prestigious lifetime achievement award. Jake shares a dance with her.

== Production ==
=== Development ===
In August 2011, before the novel's release, it was announced that Jonathan Demme had attached himself to write, produce, and direct a film adaptation of 11/22/63 with King serving as executive producer. However, in December 2012, Demme announced that he had withdrawn from the project, after disagreeing with King over what to include in the script.

On April 26, 2013, it was reported that Warner Bros. Television and J. J. Abrams' Bad Robot were in negotiations for the rights to adapt the novel as a TV series or miniseries. On September 22, 2014, it was announced that a TV series based on the novel was picked up by Hulu. Carol Spier would be a production designer. The first trailer for the series was released on November 19, 2015.

When asked about developing a sequel series, King stated, "I'd love to revisit Jake and Sadie, and also revisit the rabbit hole that dumps people into the past, but sometimes it's best not to go back for a second helping."

=== Casting ===
James Franco was chosen to star as the character of Jake Epping. After reading the novel, Franco contacted King about the rights to adapt it to film only to be told that Abrams had already acquired them. Franco wrote an essay about the book for Vice, which was noticed by Abrams, and tweeted about his disappointment at not getting the film rights, which was noticed by Bridget Carpenter. Soon after, they offered him the lead role. He accepted the role under the condition that he would be able to direct part of the series. Sarah Gadon was cast for the role of Sadie Dunhill. She was interested in the role in part because it gave her the opportunity to work with Abrams.

=== Filming ===
Filming began on June 9, 2015, in Hespeler, Ontario. Filming during June 2015 also took place in Guelph, Ontario, as well as in Ayr, Ontario, at the Queen's Tavern in Hamilton, Ontario, and in Knowles Restaurant in Dunnville, Ontario, during September 2015. During filming in Guelph, there was an incident where a man on a motorized bicycle drove past security at high speed before being stopped whereupon he was found to have crystal meth in his possession and he was arrested. In early October, the production moved to Dallas to film exterior locations at Dealey Plaza. During this time, the filming of various scenes during rush hour caused bumper to bumper traffic in the surrounding streets.

== Reception ==
The show received positive reviews from most critics. Based on 64 reviews, the show carries an 83% rating, with an average percentage of 7.19/10, on review aggregator website Rotten Tomatoes where the consensus states: "Though the execution feels almost as dated as the period it represents, 11.22.63 gradually reveals a compelling, well-performed series of events." On Metacritic, the show has a rating of 69 out of 100, based on 35 reviews.

Jack Moore of GQ commented that "the show is moody and supernatural, while somehow also remaining grounded and full of heart", and lauded Franco as the show's standout, saying "what Franco gives is a vanity-free, indulgence-free performance that feels like the work of an Old Hollywood legend. It's earnest and full-hearted." Alan Sepinwall also acclaimed Franco, stating "Franco's a revelation as Jake. He's an immensely talented actor and he's got the star quality you need to carry something this crazy, and this long." Vicki Hyman of the Newark Star-Ledger praised the performances of Franco and Gadon, writing: "Their stirring romance carries with it the same whiff of doom as Epping's visits to Dealey Plaza, and gives what could be merely an interesting and handsomely-made take on the conspiracy thriller genre more texture and depth, resonating across the ages." Hank Stuever of The Washington Post wrote that "King's work doesn't always happily travel through the portal connecting the page to the TV screen, but Hulu scores with an impressively stout-hearted, eight-part adaptation of 11/22/63."

On the other hand, Jeff Jensen of Entertainment Weekly had a more mixed reaction and criticized Franco's performance, calling it "low-watt" and "disinterested". He wrote "11.22.63 reaches some thoughtful, moving conclusions, but oh, what could have been with a more engaged star. If only there were a time machine to fix that mistake." Caroline Framke of Vox described Franco's performance as inconsistent from scene to scene, but also that the show itself creates even more ambiguity with his character. She wrote, "While he's technically old enough to portray 37-year-old Jake, Franco certainly doesn't read as anywhere close to 37, or the world-weariness Jake's supposed to exhibit." Slate author Willa Paskin believes though Franco is well known and well accomplished, he can't seem to get the "average guy" act right for this series.

=== Accolades ===
Award	Category	Recipient(s) and nominee(s)	Result	Ref.
Saturn Awards	Best Television Presentation	11.22.63	Won	

== Home media ==
11.22.63 was released on DVD and Blu-ray on August 9, 2016, in Region 1. The release includes all eight episodes, as well as a special feature titled "When the Future Fights Back", where King, Abrams, Carpenter and Franco talk about elements of the production that turned King's novel into an event series.

== See also ==
- Assassination of John F. Kennedy in popular culture
- List of original programs distributed by Hulu
