= Jonny Coyne =

Cypriot-British actor (born 1958)

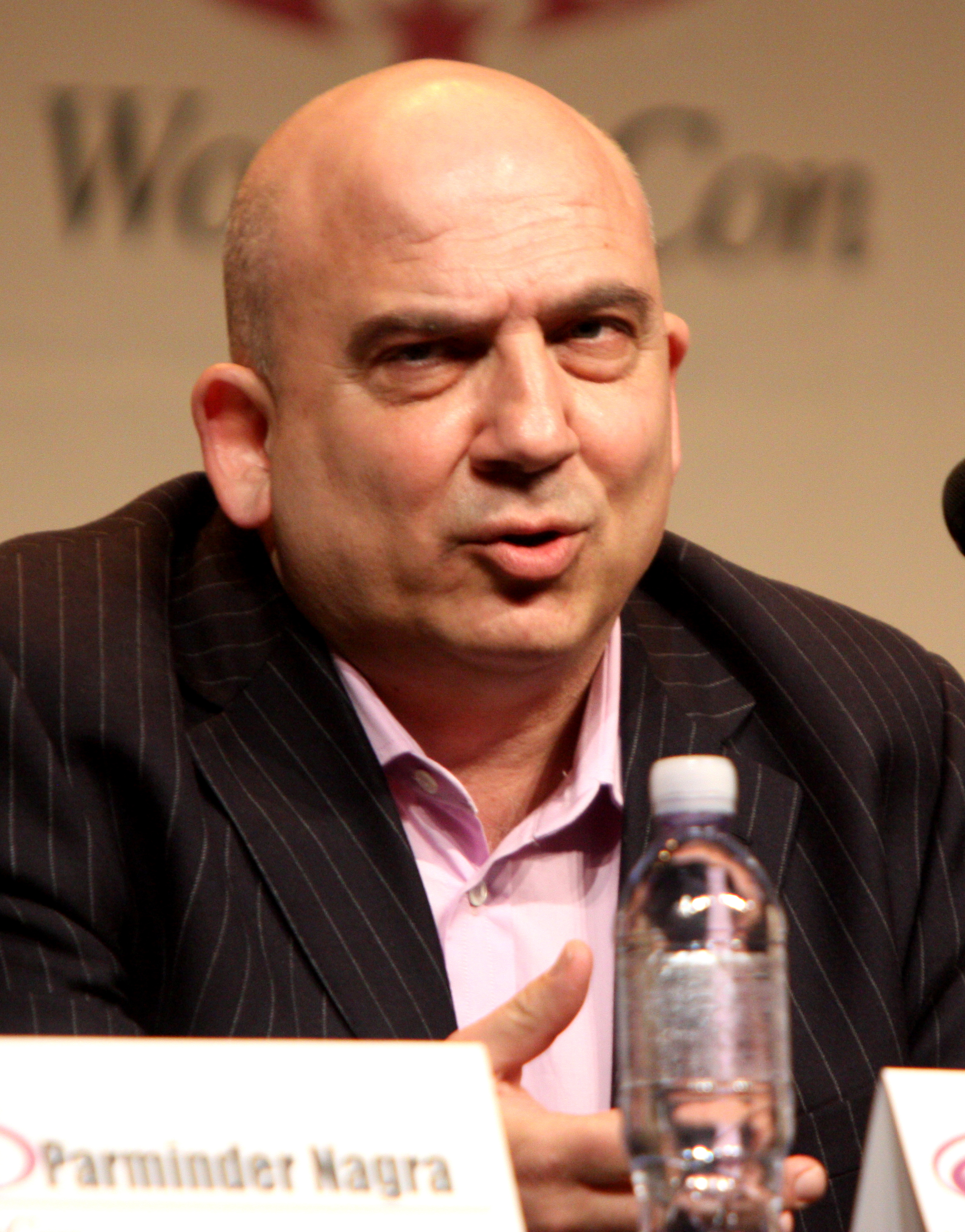
- Coyne at the 2012 WonderCon
- Born: Jonathan Coyne; 3 February 1958 (age 68); Kaimakli, Nicosia District, British Cyprus (now Kaimakli, Cyprus)
- Citizenship: United Kingdom
- Occupation: Actor
- Years active: 1990–present
- Website: trademarktalent.com/jonnycoyne/

Jonathan Coyne (born 3 February 1958) is an Cypriot-born British actor known for playing Warden Edwin James on Fox's short-lived series, Alcatraz (2012). He also appeared as Dr. Lydgate in Once Upon a Time in Wonderland and Once Upon a Time and recurred as George de Mohrenschildt in 11.22.63. Born and raised in the British Cyprus, he moved to the UK at a young age.

== Early life ==
Coyne was born in Kaimakli, British Cyprus (now Kaimakli, Cyprus)

Coyne's earliest performances were in school plays. He played The Judge in Howard Barker's Hang of the Gaol and Phaeton in Ovid's Chariot of the Sun. When his performances received positive reviews in the national press, he decided to pursue an acting career. He won a place at the Royal Academy of Dramatic Art in London and upon his graduation, he received the Hannam Clarke Award.

== Career ==
His first role on TV was on an episode of London's Burning in 1990. His next big role was in the mini-series Gulliver's Travels, starring Ted Danson. He appeared in many British TV series over the next few years, including guest appearances on EastEnders, Pulling and The Bill. In 2003, he was cast in Lara Croft: Tomb Raider – The Cradle of Life. In 2010, he was cast in The Nutcracker in 3D.

His biggest role to date was as Warden Edwin James on Alcatraz. He was later cast in Would You Rather and London Boulevard. In 2013, he was cast in the supporting film roles of a henchman in Gangster Squad, and the right-hand man of John Goodman's character in The Hangover Part III.

In 2018, he appeared in the third season of the AMC television series Preacher, in the recurring role of Allfather D'Daronique, which required him to wear a fatsuit.

He appeared in 2020's Ma Rainey's Black Bottom, which was nominated for a SAG Ensemble Award.

== Filmography ==
=== Film ===
Year	Title	Role	Notes
1996	Secrets & Lies	Fiancé	
2003	Lara Croft: Tomb Raider – The Cradle of Life	Gus Petraki	
2006	Dark Corners	Priest 2	
2007	Irina Palm	Dave	
2009	The Nutcracker in 3D	Gnomad	
2010	London Boulevard	Heavy One	
2012	Would You Rather	Bevans	
2013	Gangster Squad	Grimes	
2013	The Hangover Part III	Hector	
2014	Nightcrawler	Pawn Shop Owner	
2016	Message from the King	John	
2018	Monster	Detective Karyl	
2018	Beirut	Bernard Teppler	
2018	The Nun	Gregoro	Uncredited
2020	Ma Rainey's Black Bottom	Mel Sturdyvant	
2025	The Toxic Avenger	Thad Barkabus	
2026	The Mandalorian and Grogu	Warlord Janu Coin	

=== Television ===
Year	Title	Role	Notes
1990	London's Burning	DHSS Manager	Episode #3.4
1990–2008	The Bill	Various characters	5 episodes
1996	Gulliver's Travels	Yahoo	Episode #1.2
1997	All Quiet on the Preston Front	Vince	Episode: "Eric's Won Ton"
2003	In Deep	Customer	2 episodes
2004	Casualty	Roger Morgan	Episode: "Fallen Hero"
2005	EastEnders	Photographer	1 episode
2006	Pulling	Paulos	Episode #1.6
2008	Silent Witness	Mr. Marigold	Episode: "Safe: Part 1"
2008	Sharpe's Peril	Croop	Television film
2009	Hotel Babylon	Dickie Balls	Episode: "Episode #4.8"
2009	Merlin	Asgerd	Episode: "The Last Dragonlord"
2009	Big Top	Uncle Rico	Episode: "Thief"
2010	Marple	French Officer	Episode: "The Mirror Crack'd from Side to Side"
2010	Undercovers	Governor	2 episodes
2012	Alcatraz	Warden Edwin James	13 episodes
2013	NTSF:SD:SUV::	Craig	Episode: "TGI Murder"
2013	Once Upon a Time in Wonderland	Dr. Arthur Lydgate	2 episodes
2014	Newsreaders	Sergei Kiev	Episode: "Headless Football Player; Identity Thief"
2014–2015	Manhattan	Dr. Alek Barath	3 episodes
2014–2017	Turn: Washington's Spies	Colonel Jonathan Cooke	7 episodes
2014–2017	Mom	Victor Perugian	7 episodes
2015	Gotham	Clyde Destro / Red Hood	Episode: "Red Hood"
2015	The Grinder	Farouk	Episode: "Buckingham Malice"
2016	11.22.63	George de Mohrenschildt	5 episodes
2016	The Night Of	Detective Fitzroy	Episode: "Subtle Beast"
2016	Once Upon a Time	Dr. Arthur Lydgate	Episode: "Strange Case"
2016	Salem	Treasurer Putnam	3 episodes
2017	Twin Peaks	Polish Accountant	Episode: "Part 16"
2017–2018	The Blacklist	Ian Garvey	11 episodes
2018	MacGyver	Raymond	Episode: "Mardi Gras Beads + Chair"
2018	Preacher	Allfather D'Aronique	Recurring role
2019	The Trial of Christine Keeler	Peter Rachman	Miniseries
2023	The Mandalorian	Warlord Janu Coin	Episode: "Chapter 23: The Spies"
2023	Bodies	Farrell	Episode: "You're Dead Already"
