= 11/22/63 =

2011 novel by Stephen King

- First edition cover
- Author: Stephen King
- Language: English
- Genre: Science fiction Alternate history
- Publisher: Scribner
- Publication date: November 8, 2011
- Publication place: United States
- Media type: Print (hardcover)
- Pages: 849
- ISBN: 978-1-4516-2728-2

11/22/63 is a novel by American author Stephen King about a time traveler who attempts to prevent the assassination of United States president John F. Kennedy, which occurred on November 22, 1963. It is the 60th book published by Stephen King, his 49th novel, and the 42nd under his own name. The novel required considerable research to accurately portray the late 1950s and early 1960s. King commented on the amount of research it required, saying, "I've never tried to write anything like this before. It was really strange at first, like breaking in a new pair of shoes."

The novel was announced on King's official site on March 2, 2011. A short excerpt was released online on June 1, 2011, and another excerpt was published in the October 28, 2011, issue of Entertainment Weekly. The novel was published on November 8, 2011, and quickly became a number-one bestseller. It stayed on The New York Times Best Seller list for 16 weeks. 11/22/63 won the 2011 Los Angeles Times Book Prize for Best Mystery/Thriller and the 2012 International Thriller Writers Award for Best Novel, and was nominated for the 2012 British Fantasy Award for Best Novel and the 2012 Locus Award for Best Science Fiction Novel. The novel was also selected by The New York Times as one of its 10 best books of 2011. The novel was adapted into a Hulu miniseries in 2016, entitled 11.22.63.

== Background ==
According to King, the idea for the novel first came to him in 1971, before the release of his first novel, Carrie (1974). He was going to title it Split Track. However, he felt that a historical novel required more research than he was willing to do at the time and greater literary talent than he possessed. Like his novel Under the Dome (2009), he abandoned the project, returning to the story later in life.

King first talked publicly about the idea in Marvel Spotlight magazine issue The Dark Tower (January 27, 2007), prior to the beginning of the ongoing comic book adaptation of his Dark Tower series. In a piece in the magazine titled "An Open Letter from Stephen King", he writes about possible original ideas for comics:

I'd like to tell a time-travel story where this guy finds a diner that connects to 1958... you always go back to the same day. So one day he goes back and just stays. Leaves his 2007 life behind. His goal? To get up to November 22, 1963, and stop Lee Harvey Oswald. He does, and he's convinced he's just FIXED THE WORLD. But when he goes back to '07, the world's a nuclear slag-heap. Not good to fool with Father Time. So then he has to go back again and stop himself..... only he's taken on a fatal dose of radiation, so it's a race against time.

Commenting on the book as historical fiction, King said: "This might be a book where we really have a chance to get an audience who's not my ordinary audience. Instead of people who read horror stories, people who read The Help or People of the Book might like this book."

King and longtime researcher Russ Dorr prepared for the novel by reading many historical documents and newspaper archives from the period, looking at clothing and appliance ads, sports scores, and television listings. The book contains detailed minutiae such as the 1958 price of a pint of root beer (10 cents) or a haircut (40 cents). King and Dorr traveled to Dallas, where they visited Oswald's apartment building (now a private residence), found the home of General Edwin Walker, and had a private tour of the Sixth Floor Museum in the Texas School Book Depository. King studied various conspiracy theories, ultimately coming to the conclusion that Oswald had acted alone. King met with historian Doris Kearns Goodwin, an assistant to Lyndon B. Johnson and the author of books about several presidents, and used some of her ideas of worst-case political scenarios that might occur in the absence of Kennedy's assassination.

== Publication ==
The trade hardcover edition features a dust jacket that is a faux newspaper front page, with the front of the jacket featuring an article recounting the real historical event of Kennedy's assassination, and the back featuring an alternative history article speaking of the event as just a failed assassination attempt that Kennedy survives unscathed. The newspaper headlines were written by King himself. In addition to the regular trade edition, Scribner produced a signed limited edition of 1,000 copies, 850 of which were made available for sale beginning on November 8, 2011 (ISBN 978-1-4516-6385-3). This edition features a different dust jacket, exclusive chapter-heading photos, and a DVD. Due to a website problem on November 8, most copies remained unsold and a drawing ran from November 10 to 11 to sell the remaining copies. There was also a limited edition of 700 published in the United Kingdom. It was a slipcased hardcover with deluxe binding, photographic endpapers, and a facsimile signature, and included a DVD.

== Plot ==
In 2011, Jake Epping, a divorced high school English teacher in Lisbon Falls, Maine, is summoned by friend Al Templeton, the owner of a local diner. He finds Al is ill with terminal lung cancer, despite appearing perfectly healthy the night before. Al instructs Jake to step into the back of the diner's pantry, where Jake finds a time slip leading to Lisbon Falls as it existed on September 9, 1958. After exploring the town, Jake returns to 2011 and learns that the portal leads to the same moment of the same day every time it is used, and that a visitor will always return to the present by a margin of two minutes.

Because the portal gives one the ability to alter the present by changing an event in the past, Al reveals that he had concocted a plan to prevent John F. Kennedy's assassination, hoping that doing so would stop the Vietnam War and change history for the better. He spent four years in the past after entering the portal the previous night, travelling to Dallas, Texas, to track Lee Harvey Oswald, plotting to kill him during his attempted murder of General Edwin Walker. However, due to his cancer, Al is unable to continue his mission. He recruits a reluctant Jake to complete it.

As an experiment, Jake travels back to 1958 to save the family of learning disabled janitor Harry Dunning from being attacked by their father on Halloween. Using the alias "George Amberson", Jake buys a car and travels to Harry's hometown of Derry, Maine; he finds Harry's father, Frank, and tracks his movements. After saving all but one of Harry's siblings from Frank's brutal assault, Jake returns to 2011, to find that he indirectly caused Harry to die in Vietnam. Al dies by suicide.

Resigned, Jake re-enters the portal, travels back to Derry, and kills Frank ahead of his rampage. Jake eventually settles in Jodie, Texas, where he becomes a full-time English teacher at a local consolidated school. He spends several years establishing his identity. Jake winds up falling for school librarian Sadie and having a positive effect on the students of a local high school. Jake reveals to Sadie that he is from the future and his plans to prevent Kennedy's assassination. Sadie is saved by Jake from her ex-husband, John. Ultimately, the pair rush to the Texas School Book Depository, where Jake interrupts Oswald. This saves Kennedy; however, Sadie is killed.

Jake returns to a dystopian, war-torn future brought about by his actions. He finds that after Kennedy served two terms, segregationist George Wallace was elected president in 1968. The Vietnam War not only still occurred, but ended in the use of nuclear weapons, the Civil Rights Act of 1964 was never passed, Martin Luther King Jr. was assassinated by the FBI, and the US is now fractured. Earth is also plagued by constant, devastating natural disasters, and the sky itself appears to be tearing. Jake discovers that each trip to the past causes a separate reality to be formed, and that his journey has caused time to begin falling apart. He realizes that he cannot save Kennedy for the good of the future, prompting him to return to the past to "reset" the results of his intervention. Jake finds that Sadie survived without his interference, and is being celebrated as a "Citizen of the Century" in Jodie, and he goes to the party being held.

=== Alternate ending ===
King published an alternate ending on his official website on January 24, 2012, in which Jake finds a November 22, 2013, news article where Sadie has turned 80. She had married a man named Trevor Anderson, with whom she had five children, eleven grandchildren, and six great-grandchildren. Before release, this ending was scrapped and swapped for the published version at the suggestion of King's son, writer Joe Hill.

== Characters ==
=== Fictional ===
Jacob "Jake" Epping
A teacher of English at Lisbon Falls High School in Maine, Jake uses the alias of "George Amberson" to travel back to 1958, make his way to Texas, and track Lee Harvey Oswald's movements leading up to the Kennedy assassination. Part of Jake's time is spent in Jodie, a small town on the outskirts of Dallas; there, he becomes a teacher of English for a consolidated school and becomes well-liked by the students and faculty for his stage productions.
Sadie Dunhill
From Savannah, Georgia, replaces Miz Mimi as DCHS librarian. She has run away from her abusive and psychotic husband, Johnny; becomes Jake's lover and fiancée. Jake reveals the truth of his identity and mission to Sadie who agrees to helping Jake prevent the Kennedy killing.
Al Templeton
The middle-aged proprietor of Al's Diner and long-time acquaintance of Jake. He shares the secret of his time portal, and his plan to prevent the assassination of John F. Kennedy, with Jake. His plan to do this himself has been thwarted by his cigarette smoking leading to terminal lung cancer.
Harry Dunning
A janitor at Lisbon Falls High School and student in Jake's evening GED class. His submission of a paper about the night his father murdered his mother and siblings with a hammer provides Jake with motivation and a test case to see if history can be changed.
Frank Dunning
The father of Harry Dunning. After reading Harry's essay about Frank killing his wife (Harry's mother), two of Harry's brothers and injuring Harry badly while leaving his sister in a fatal coma, Jake sets out to kill Frank to prevent the killings.
Deacon Simmons ("Deke")
The principal of Denholm Consolidated High School in Jodie, Texas, who hires "George Amberson" to teach English for a probationary year. He becomes married to Mimi Corcoran and retires. He is Jake's friend, and, besides Sadie, is the only person who knows about his mission to save Kennedy, after Sadie tells him.
Mimi Corcoran Simmons ("Miz Mimi")
The DCHS librarian who is Deke's girlfriend and briefly becomes his second wife, until her death from cancer. Miz Mimi takes a liking to "George" and becomes one of his good friends.
Ellen Dockerty ("Miz Ellie")
An experienced DCHS teacher who replaces Deke Simmons as principal. Becomes a good friend of Sadie and "George" and admires the latter as a teacher, but is troubled when she discovers his teaching references are fake. She is angry at his refusal to tell Sadie what he is up to, but remains Jake's ally when he and Sadie are injured.

=== Historical ===
Lee Harvey Oswald
A former expatriate to the Soviet Union who lives in a series of squalid residences in the Dallas-Fort Worth area with his wife and child. Oswald, who is vocal about his support for Communist causes, is depicted as a troubled ill-tempered loner who acts out of a self-absorbed desire for fame.
Marina Nikolayevna Prusakova
A Soviet immigrant and Oswald's wife, Marina is depicted as being a victim of her husband's physical and verbal abuse, as well as the abuse of Oswald's domineering mother, Marguerite.
George de Mohrenschildt
A Soviet expatriate who becomes a friend of Oswald's, inciting the would-be assassin with hyperbolic political rhetoric. Jake eventually realizes, however, that de Mohrenschildt is an apolitical eccentric who merely finds Oswald "amusing". Jake poses as a government agent and threatens de Mohrenschildt into ending his association with Oswald.
James Patrick Hosty
An FBI agent who interrogates Jake following the assassination attempt. Hosty eventually allows Jake to leave Dallas, mostly out of a desire to avoid responsibility for his previous failure to properly investigate Oswald.
Malcolm Oliver Perry
A doctor who treats Jake after his beating. In real life, Perry treated President Kennedy as well as Oswald.

Other historical characters depicted in the book include President John F. Kennedy and First Lady Jacqueline Kennedy, who offer their gratitude to Jake during telephone calls following the assassination attempt. In the alternative timeline Jake creates after stopping Oswald, Kennedy is re-elected in 1964 and dies in 1983. George Wallace, Curtis LeMay and Hubert Humphrey occupy the Oval Office after Kennedy finishes his second term; Ronald Reagan defeats Humphrey in the 1976 election. Wallace had launched a nuclear strike on Hanoi in order to defeat North Vietnam. Wallace is himself assassinated by Arthur Bremer and succeeded by Lemay. Hillary Clinton is president when Jake discovers the dystopia of 2011. Legendary Texas musician Doug Sahm is portrayed as a young man playing with his band at the wedding reception for Deke and Mimi in 1961. Police Officer J. D. Tippit is shown in Jake's hospital room after his attack, asking questions about his beating. In real life, Tippit was killed after the assassination of Kennedy.

== Critical reception ==
The reviews for 11/22/63 were generally positive, with The New York Times selecting the novel as one of its top five fiction books of the year and the Las Vegas Review-Journal calling it King's "best novel in more than a decade".

NPR book critic Alan Cheuse found no fault with the structure, commenting: "I wouldn't have [King] change a single page." USA Today gave the novel four out of four stars, noting the novel retains the suspenseful tension of King's earlier works but is not of the same genre. "[The novel] is not typical Stephen King." Janet Maslin of The New York Times also commented on the genre change and pacing but felt the writer has built the narrative tightly enough for the reader to suspend disbelief. "The pages of '11/22/63' fly by, filled with immediacy, pathos and suspense. It takes great brazenness to go anywhere near this subject matter. But it takes great skill to make this story even remotely credible. Mr. King makes it all look easy, which is surely his book's fanciest trick." The review in the Houston Chronicle called the novel "one of King's best books in a long time" but "overlong", noting: "As is usually the case with King's longer books, there's a lot of self-indulgent fat in 11/22/63 that could have been trimmed." The review in the Bangor Daily News commented that the novel "[is] another winner", but provided no critical review of the plot construction. Lev Grossman, in reviewing the novel for Time, called the novel "the work of a master craftsman" but commented that "the wires go slack from time to time" and the book wanders from genre to genre, particularly in the middle. More pointedly, Los Angeles Times book critic David Ulin called the novel "a misguided effort in story and writing"; Ulin's primary criticism is the conceit of the story, which requires the reader to follow two plotlines simultaneously—historical fiction built upon the Kennedy assassination as well as the tale of a time-traveling English teacher—which adds a page load to the novel that Ulin found excessive.

=== Awards and honors ===
- 2011 Los Angeles Times Book Prize (Mystery/Thriller)
- 2011 Goodreads Choice Award (Best Science Fiction)

== Adaptation ==
On September 22, 2014, it was announced that a TV series based on the novel was picked up by Hulu. James Franco was chosen to star as the character of Jake Epping. The series premiered on Presidents' Day, February 15, 2016, and was met with positive reviews.

== See also ==
- John F. Kennedy assassination in popular culture
- "Profile in Silver": The Twilight Zone episode with similar plot
- Timescape (1980): novel by Gregory Benford
- A Time to Remember (1986): novel by Stanley Shapiro
