= Willem Oltmans =

Dutch investigative journalist

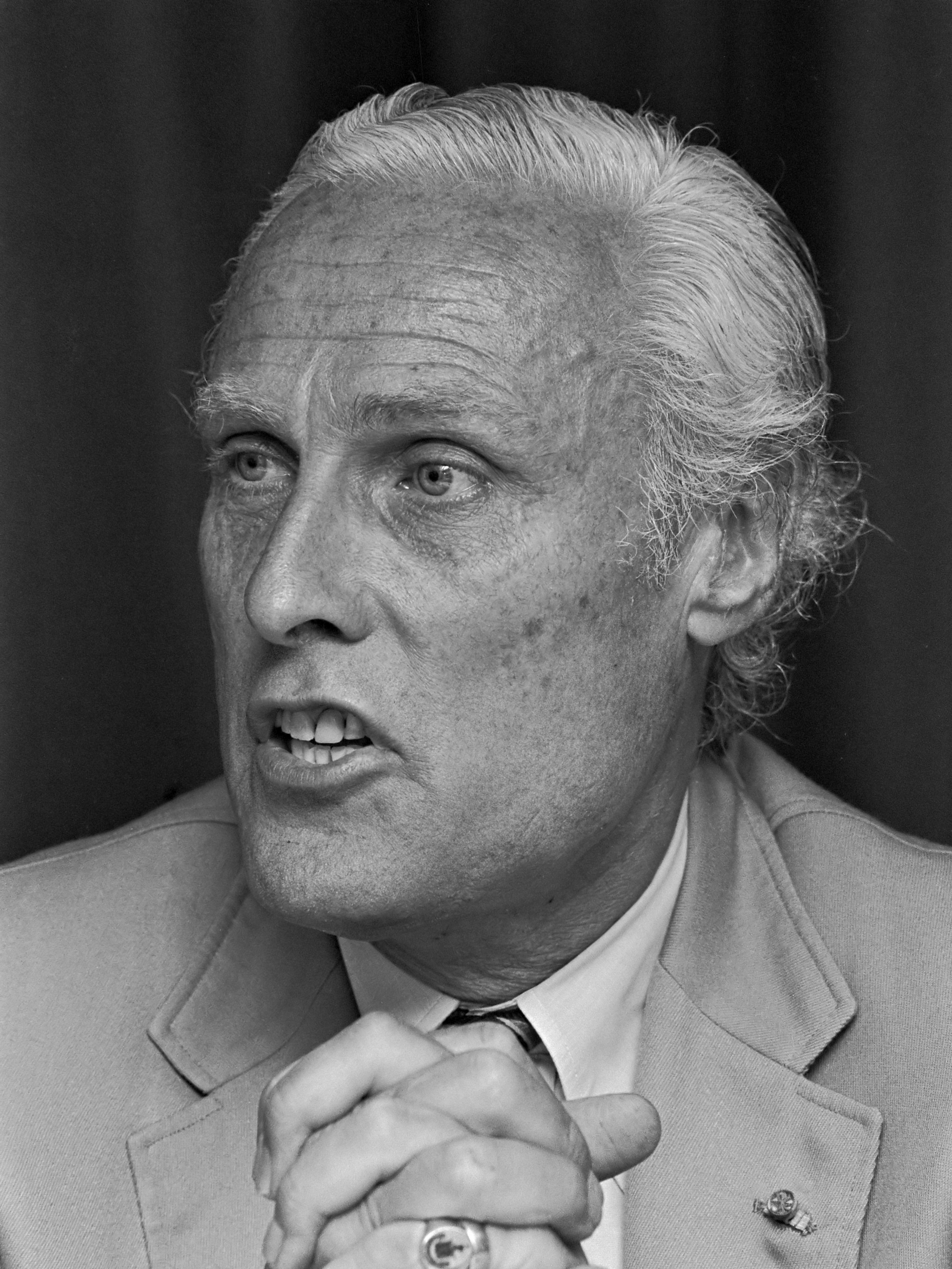
- Oltmans in 1983
- Born: Willem Leonard Oltmans; 10 June 1925; Huizen, Netherlands
- Died: 30 September 2004 (aged 79); Amsterdam, Netherlands
- Education: Nyenrode Business University; Yale University
- Occupation: Investigative Journalist · Author · Interviewer
- Years active: 1950–2004

Willem Leonard Oltmans (addressed as William Oltmans in some English publications; 10 June 1925 – 30 September 2004) was a Dutch investigative journalist and author active in international politics.

Due to the highly critical stance he often took towards Dutch foreign policy, as of 1956, the Dutch government conspired to keep him out of work. A lengthy lawsuit (1991–2000) involving the Royal family led to the state having to pay him damages.

== Early life ==
Oltmans was born into a wealthy family with roots in the Dutch East Indies. During the Second World War he was a member of the Dutch Resistance. "We blew up a German train," Oltmans told the Dutch daily Reformatorisch Dagblad in 2003. "Hitler called me a terrorist, but I saw myself as a freedom fighter."

He studied at Nyenrode Business University (1946) and Yale University (1948), without graduating. Originally intent on a career with the diplomatic corps of the foreign service, he ended up working in press offices in the Netherlands (1953–1955). He was a close confidant of both Beatrix and Gertrude Büringh Boekhoudt (24 March 1893 – 3 September 1982) who had been Crown Princess Beatrix's tutor since April 1951. He married in 1955 and worked as a freelance reporter in Rome in 1956 for De Telegraaf when he interviewed and befriended Indonesian president Sukarno during Sukarno's trip to Italy in 1956. This started his career as a controversial journalist which the Dutch Security Service would closely watch for many decades.

On 10 June 1958, he moved to the United States.

Convinced that a well connected and informed individual could play a decisive role in the international political arena, he assumed a pro-active part in global political developments, becoming both a news reporter and news maker.

== Dutch state conspiracy ==
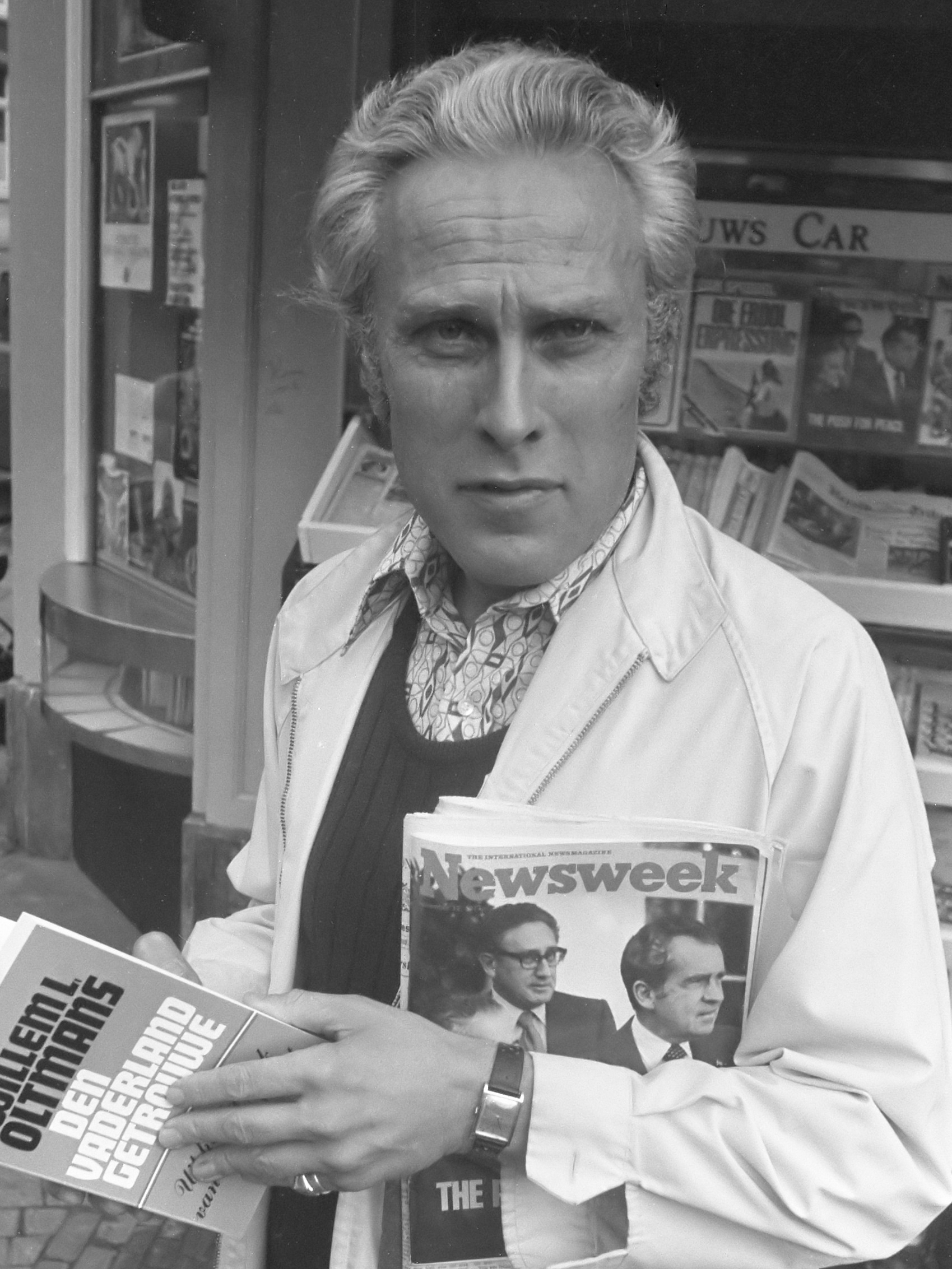
Willem Oltmans in 1973

Against the will of the Dutch government, Oltmans interviewed Indonesian president Sukarno in 1956. Once he became a confidant of Sukarno and part of his inner circle he took it upon himself to convince the broader public in the Netherlands of the legitimacy of Sukarno's viewpoints. In 1957, he pleaded for the transfer of Dutch New Guinea to Indonesia while in Indonesia. He claimed to have prevented a Dutch war against Indonesia over New Guinea by sending a memo to US president. Subsequently Joseph Luns, Minister of Foreign Affairs, covertly tried everything to sabotage Oltmans' career, with considerable success: for a long time, Oltmans was forced to live off welfare. Luns, who now had become Oltmans' nemesis, called him a 'one engine mosquito'. In 1995, Oltmans published his book My friend Sukarno.

He fought a long lawsuit (1991–2000) against the Dutch state, which he eventually won. In 2000, a commission awarded him eight million guilders (four million dollars) in damages, after taxes. Having paid two million guilders in lawyer's fees, Oltmans bought a penthouse on a canal in Amsterdam and a Steinway piano.

== Kennedy conspiracy ==
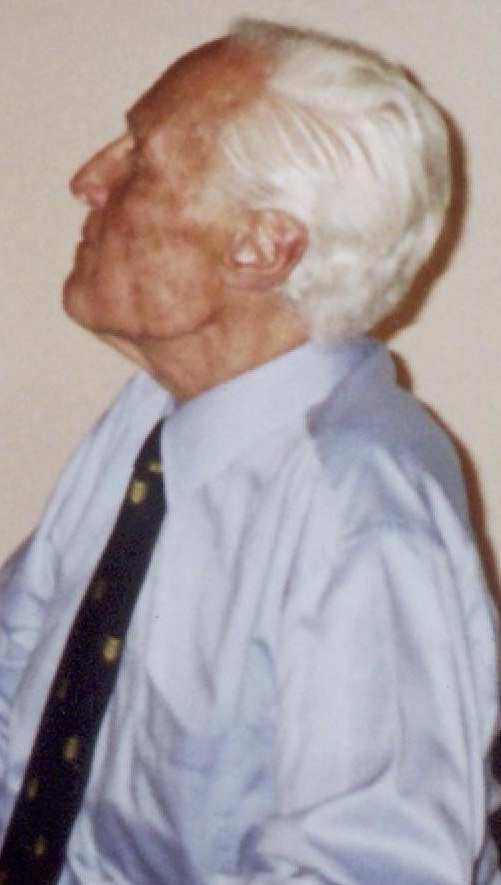
Willem Oltmans during his last public performance at the Universiteit Maastricht (22 April 2004)

Oltmans was based in the US in the 1960s, where he worked as a reporter for Dutch TV broadcaster NOS and lobbied members of the President Kennedy's administration regarding New Guinea. On 5 April 1961, he attended a meeting with the United States National Security Advisor McGeorge Bundy at which he supported the transfer of New Guinea from the Netherlands to Indonesia which occurred on 15 August 1962, with support from the United States. Joseph Luns, who was a prominent Dutch diplomat, vehemently opposed this transfer and subsequently had Oltmans declared persona non grata for life.

After Kennedy was assassinated in Dallas in 1963, Oltmans interviewed the mother of accused assassin Lee Harvey Oswald, Marguerite Oswald whom he met in March 1964 at JFK Airport and was seated next to her on a flight. Further investigation led him to Oswald's acquaintance George de Mohrenschildt. On 15 October 1967, Oltmans interviewed the de Mohrenschildts for NOS which resulted in a 40-minute film that was the only full-length filmed interview of George de Mohrenschildt. However, the film, which was kept at Hilversum, disappeared in 1975.

In 1977, De Mohrenschildt agreed to disclose information to Oltmans, but disappeared from their meeting place and was found dead in Florida a few weeks later. On 3 March 1977, De Mohrenschildt and Otlmans flew to the Schiphol Airport in the Netherlands where De Mohrenschildt had left his luggage, money and keys at Oltmans home and then, a few days later, flew together to Brussels where they had a 12:30 lunch date with a Soviet diplomat with whom De Mohrenschildt conversed with in Russian and abruptly left the table but Oltmans never saw De Mohrenschildt again.

On 29 March 1977, De Mohrenschildt was found dead at his daughters home in Florida due to an apparent self-inflicted shotgun wound via the mouth. Oltmans stated that a taped recording of the event existed in which footsteps can be heard, followed by the sound of a shotgun discharging, and then footsteps heard again. L. Richardson Preyer of the House Select Committee on Assassinations investigating the assassination of Kennedy stated that De Mohrenschildt was "a crucial witness, based on the new information that he had". A few days later, Oltmans told the HSCA that de Mohrenschildt had implicated himself in the conspiracy to kill President Kennedy. And Pat S. Russell, who was De Mohrenschildt's attorney said "I definitely feel there was a conspiracy and that definitely was the opinion of George." Oltmans testified for three hours behind closed doors and told the committee that De Mohrenschildt told him he had discussed the assassination of Kennedy with Lee Harvey Oswald from A to Z. "De Mohrenschildt told me that Oswald acted at his (De Mohrenschildt's) instructions and that he knew Oswald was going to kill Kennedy," Oltmans said. Although Oltmans had given information to the Committee shortly before, De Mohrenschildt's death had released Oltmans from his promise not to divulge certain information. Oltmans revealed that De Mohrenschildt, whom he had known for ten years, had told him that there had been a conspiracy to assassinate Kennedy and that he had played a role in the conspiracy. De Mohrenschildt said that CIA and FBI personnel were involved as well.

Oltmans played the role of De Mohrenschildt in Oliver Stone's 1991 film about the assassination, JFK.

== In the Soviet Union ==
In the 1980s, Oltmans endeavoured to create a more balanced opinion in the West about the Soviet Union. Looking for a more poised perspective on the one sided bad image of the evil empire's communist power, he often traveled to Russia. Together with the Kremlin's foreign expert Georgi Arbatov, he wrote the book 'The Soviet position', elaborating on Moscow's perspective on the east–west issues in 1981. The book received much attention and was published in several languages.

== In Suriname ==
Also in the '80s, Oltmans actively interfered with the postcolonial Dutch-Suriname relationship. He recognised a bilateral relationship based in negative sentiments similar to the Dutch-Indonesian relationship. Intent on playing a mediating role Oltmans traveled to Suriname to interview military dictator Bouterse. He published a book that was banned in Suriname and misunderstood in the Netherlands.

== In South Africa ==
Due to the ban imposed on him by Minister Luns, Oltmans was forced to help support himself through his family's inheritance; the death of his parents (1966 and 1974) and some bad investments caused him financial difficulty. In the late eighties, he intended to use his large global network as a consultant to introduce entrepreneurs to Eastern European business opportunities. Through a string of quarrels with his stakeholders this initiative failed completely and Oltmans left for South Africa.

Both his brothers had settled in South Africa in 1948. He had visited the country regularly and in 1990 decided to settle there permanently. In South Africa, he continued his tendency of actively intervening in local politics. His investigative reporting was not appreciated by the shaky South African regime of the time and in August 1992, he was deported to Jordan on charges of espionage. Oltmans always insisted the Dutch Security Service was involved in his deportation.

== Publications (selected) ==
- Persona Non Grata (Papieren Tijger, Breda, 1994) ISBN 978-90-6728-081-5
- Mijn vriend Sukarno (Spectrum, Utrecht, 1995) ISBN 90-274-4762-4
- De staat van bedrog (Papieren Tijger, Breda, 1998) ISBN 978-90-6728-095-2
- Cry for war (Papieren Tijger, Breda, 2003) ISBN 978-90-6728-151-5
- Laatste wapenfeiten (Papieren Tijger, Breda, 2009) ISBN 978-90-6728-239-0
- Reporting on the Kennedy Assassination (University Press of Kansas, 2017) ISBN 978-07-0062-378-5

== Filmography ==
Year	Title	Role	Notes
1985	Hier is... Adriaan van Dis (TV series)	Self (guest)	
1991	JFK (film)	George de Mohrenschildt	
1998	Dit was het nieuws (TV series)	Self	
2002	De 100% ab show (TV series)	Self	

== See also ==
- Cornell Paper
- Benedict Anderson
- Robert Kraft
- George Kahin
