= Malcolm Perry (physician) =

American physician

- Born: Malcolm Oliver Perry II; September 3, 1929; Allen, Texas, US
- Died: December 5, 2009 (aged 80); Tyler, Texas, US
- Education: University of Texas (1951); Southwestern Medical School (1955)
- Occupation: Physician / surgeon
- Known for: Attending to John F. Kennedy at Parkland Memorial Hospital on November 22, 1963

Malcolm Oliver Perry II (September 3, 1929 – December 5, 2009) was an American physician and surgeon. He was one of the doctors who attended to President John F. Kennedy at Parkland Memorial Hospital in Dallas, Texas, on November 22, 1963 after Kennedy was shot. Two days later, he attended to Kennedy's assassin Lee Harvey Oswald after he was shot.

== Biography ==
Perry was born in Allen, Texas, on September 3, 1929. He was raised by his grandfather, Malcolm Oliver Perry I. Perry graduated from Plano High School in 1947 and went on to the University of Texas at Austin. Following his school life in 1951 with a Bachelor of Arts, Perry went to Southwestern Medical School, becoming a medical doctor in 1955. Perry did his internship at Letterman Hospital in San Francisco, California, for a year, before joining the United States Air Force for two years. Perry was stationed at Geiger Field in Spokane, Washington.

Following his military duties, Perry worked at Parkland Memorial Hospital in Dallas, Texas, for four years as a general surgical resident, although from September 1962 to September 1963, he traveled to the University of California at San Francisco to study vascular surgery. During that time, he became board certified by the American Board of Surgery.

When President Kennedy was shot on November 22, 1963, he was taken to Parkland Hospital. Perry was one of the doctors who attended to Kennedy, performing a tracheotomy over the small wound in Kennedy's throat. Perry also rendered aid to Texas Governor John Connally, who was travelling in the car with Kennedy and was also shot.

Perry said at a press conference on the day of the assassination that "there was an entrance wound below his Adam's apple" and another in the back of his head. He said that he was not certain that two bullets were responsible for these two wounds, it may have been he said, that the wound in Kennedy's neck was from the same bullet which left a hole in the back of his head, creating an entrance wound in the throat and an exit wound in the head. Ten years later he said that he was "pretty naive" in making that statement to the press, but that he would not change anything, "I could only report what I saw. I just tried to answer as honestly as I could". When interviewed by the Warren Commission, Perry said that he then believed that a "full jacketed bullet without deformation passing through the skin would leave a similar wound for an exit and entrance wound and with the facts which you have made available and with these assumptions, I believe that it was an exit wound."

Reporter Jimmy Breslin spoke to Perry at length about his thoughts and feelings while operating on Kennedy during a November 23 press conference. Breslin wrote a story the following day that focused on Perry; Rev. Oscar Huber, who administered Kennedy's last rites; and Vernon O'Neal, who supplied a casket for Kennedy's burial. The piece, published in the New York Herald Tribune on Nov. 24, 1963, became an acclaimed classic. Perry complained that the story got the chronology and some of the medical details wrong, but he said later, "the major focus is correct" and said he was touched by Breslin's "concern and kindness" during their interview.

Following the shooting of Lee Harvey Oswald by Jack Ruby on November 24, Perry was one of the doctors to tend to Oswald. Following Oswald's death, Perry made an effort to leave the Dallas area to avoid the many press conferences and press questions. Perry left for McAllen in Hidalgo County in South Texas, the home of his mother-in-law, but he was followed there by a reporter from United Press International.

Perry rarely spoke about the events of November 22, saying that it was simply a terrible day and one he chose not to talk about again.

Perry later became chief of vascular surgery at Weill Cornell Medical Center in Manhattan from 1978 to 1988. He served as a professor in the Department of Surgery at Texas Tech University in Lubbock, Texas, in the early 1990s. He was professor emeritus at the University of Texas Southwestern Medical Center until his death.

== Later life ==
Perry lived in Jacksonville, Texas. He died from lung cancer in Tyler, Texas on December 5, 2009.

== Portrayals in film ==
In the 2013 film Parkland, Perry is portrayed by Colin Hanks.

== See also ==
- Assassination of John F. Kennedy
- Single bullet theory
