= Edwin Walker =

American army officer and conservative activist (1909–1993)

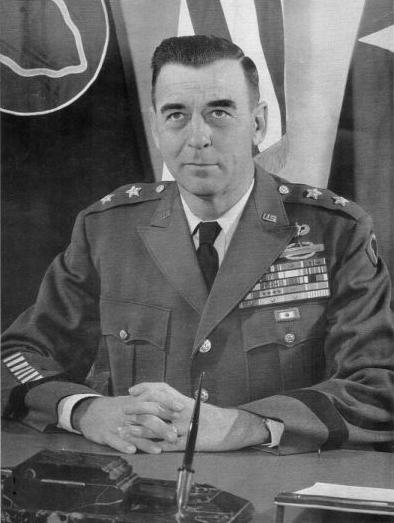
- Born: Edwin Anderson Walker; November 10, 1909; Kerr County, Texas, US
- Died: October 31, 1993 (aged 83); Dallas, Texas, US
- Military career
- Allegiance: United States of America
- Branch: United States Army
- Service years: 1931–1961
- Rank: Major general
- Commands: 24th Infantry Division
- Conflicts: World War II; Korean War
- Awards: Silver Star; Legion of Merit (2); Bronze Star Medal (2)

Edwin Anderson Walker (November 10, 1909 – October 31, 1993) was a United States Army major general who served in World War II and the Korean War. Walker resigned his commission in 1959, but President Dwight D. Eisenhower refused to accept his resignation and gave Walker command of the 24th Infantry Division in Augsburg, Germany. Walker again resigned his commission in 1961 after being publicly and formally admonished by the Joint Chiefs of Staff for allegedly referring to Eleanor Roosevelt and Harry S. Truman as "pink" in print and for violating the Hatch Act of 1939 by attempting to influence the votes of his troops. President John F. Kennedy accepted his resignation, making Walker only the second US general to resign during the 20th century, after Eisenhower resigned in 1952 to become president.

In early 1962, Walker campaigned to become governor of Texas and came in last of five candidates with less than 10% of the vote in the Democratic primary election to the eventual winner, John Connally. In October 1962, Walker was arrested for promoting riots at the University of Mississippi in protest against the admission of black student James Meredith into the all-white university. Attorney General Robert F. Kennedy ordered Walker committed to a mental asylum for a 90-day evaluation, but the ACLU and psychiatrist Thomas Szasz protested along with right-wing groups, and Walker was released in five days. Attorney Robert Morris in early 1963 convinced a Mississippi grand jury not to charge Walker with a crime.

Walker reported that he was the target of an assassination attempt at his home on April 10, 1963, but escaped serious injury when a bullet fired from outside hit a window frame and fragmented. After its investigation into the assassination of John F. Kennedy, the Warren Commission concluded that Walker's attempted assailant had been Lee Harvey Oswald.

== Early life and military career ==
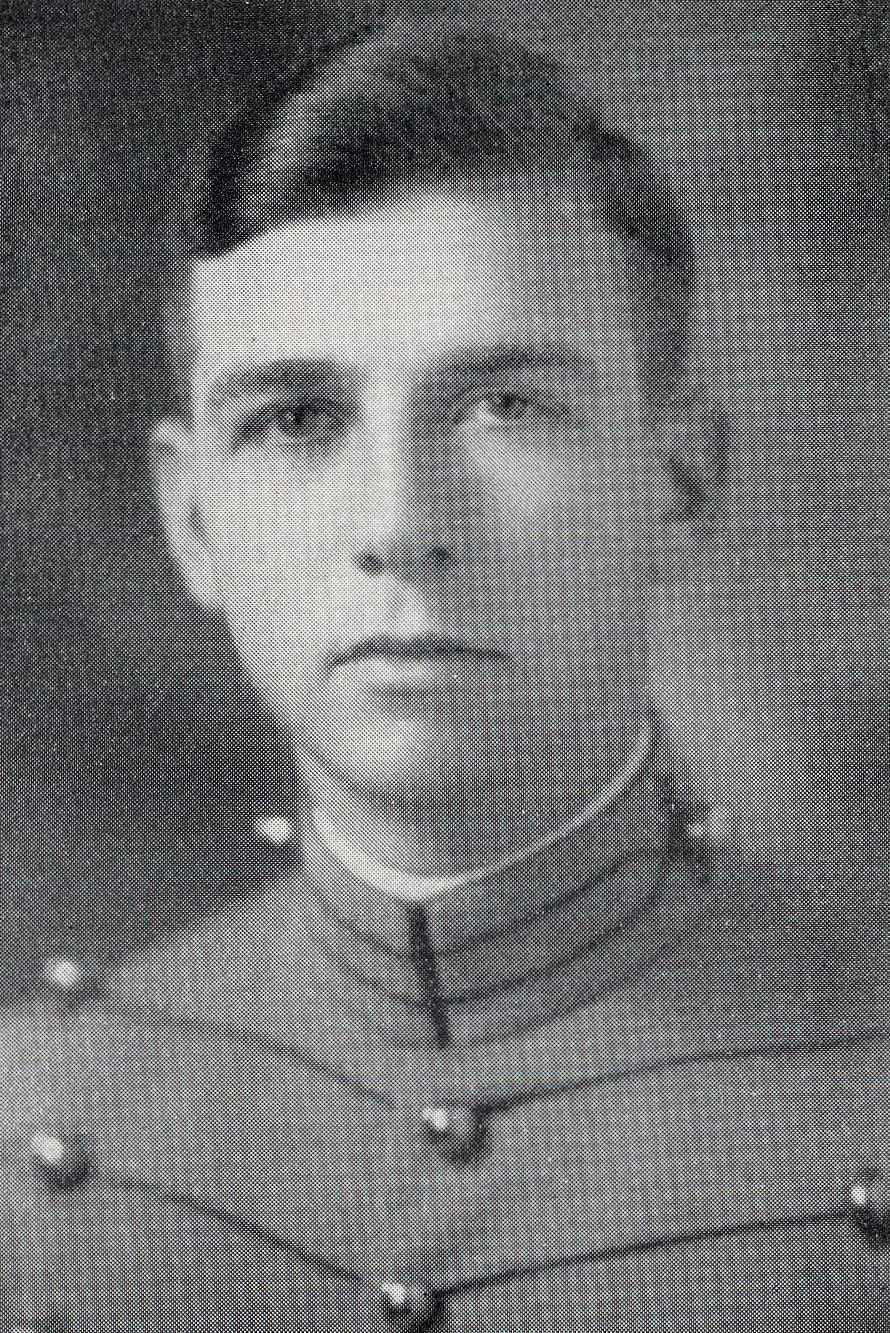
Walker as a United States Military Academy cadet c. 1931

Walker was born in 1909 in the town of Center Point in Kerr County, Texas, in the Texas Hill Country. He graduated in 1927 from the New Mexico Military Institute. He attended the United States Military Academy at West Point, from which he graduated in 1931.

Walker's training was in artillery, but in World War II he commanded a sub-unit of the Canadian-American First Special Service Force. Walker took command of the force's 3rd Regiment while still in the United States, and commanded the regiment throughout its time in the Aleutian Islands campaign and Italy. Their first combat actions began in December 1943, and after battling through the Winter Line, the force was withdrawn for redeployment to the Anzio beachhead in early 1944. After the fight for Rome in June 1944, the force was withdrawn again to prepare for Operation Dragoon. In August 1944, Walker succeeded Robert T. Frederick as the unit's second, and last, commanding officer. The FSSF landed on the Islands of Hyeres off the French Riviera in the autumn of 1944, defeating a strong German garrison. Walker commanded the FSSF when it was disbanded in early 1945.

Walker experienced combat during the Korean War, commanding the Third Infantry Division's 7th Infantry Regiment and serving as a senior advisor to the army of the Republic of Korea.

Walker was then assigned as commander of the Arkansas Military District in Little Rock, Arkansas. In 1957, he implemented an order by President Dwight D. Eisenhower to quell civil disturbances related to the desegregation of Little Rock's Central High School. Osro Cobb, the US Attorney for the Eastern District of Arkansas, recalls that Walker "made it clear from the outset ... that he would do any and everything necessary to see that the black students attended Central High School as ordered by the federal court... he would arrange protection for them and their families, if necessary, and also supervise their transportation to and from the school for their safety."

Walker repeatedly protested to Eisenhower that using federal troops to enforce racial integration was against his conscience. Although he obeyed orders and successfully integrated Little Rock High School, he began listening to segregationist preacher Billy James Hargis and oil tycoon H. L. Hunt, whose anti-communist radio program Life Line was supported by conservative activist and publisher Dan Smoot. Anti-communist activists in the late 1950s claimed that communists controlled important parts of the US government and the United Nations, and that some Soviet spies and agents occupied prominent positions within the federal government.

In 1959, Walker met publisher Robert Welch, the founder of the John Birch Society who taught his followers that Eisenhower was a communist and that the civil rights movement was a communist plot.

On August 4, 1959, Walker submitted his resignation to the US Army, claiming the US government had been infiltrated by an international communist conspiracy. Eisenhower denied Walker's request, however, and instead offered him command of the more than 10,000 troops in the 24th Infantry Division stationed in Augsburg, Germany, which Walker accepted. He began promoting his "Pro-Blue" indoctrination program for troops, which included a reading list of materials by Hargis and the John Birch Society. The name "Pro-Blue", said Walker, was intended to suggest "anti-red." He later wrote that the Pro-Blue program was based upon his experiences in Korea, where he saw "hastily mobilized and deployed soldiers 'bug out' in the face of Communist units with inferior equipment and often smaller numbers. American soldiers, unprepared for the psychological battlefield, needed to know why they had to beat the enemy as well as the how."

The John Birch Society regularly claimed that all US presidents from Franklin D. Roosevelt onward had been communists, and Walker was quoted by the Overseas Weekly as saying that Harry S. Truman, Eleanor Roosevelt, and Secretary of State Dean Acheson were "definitely pink." Finally, a number of soldiers had complained that Walker was instructing them how to vote in the forthcoming American election by using the Conservative Voting Index, which was biased toward the Republican Party. Walker denied the allegation that he provided voting instructions to soldiers and that the allegation was based on an article in the division newspaper that provided instructions for filling out absentee ballots. Walker was relieved of his command by Secretary of Defense Robert McNamara, while an inquiry was conducted. In October, Walker was reassigned to Hawaii to become assistant chief of staff for training and operations in the Pacific region.

Walker decided for the second time to resign from the US Army. He was entitled to retire, but he chose instead to make a political statement. Walker chose political activism to his 30-year military career, so on November 2, 1961, Walker publicly resigned (thereby forfeiting his Army pension). John F. Kennedy offered Walker a new command in Hawaii instead, but Walker spurned it. Weeks later Walker said: "It will be my purpose now, as a civilian, to attempt to do what I have found it no longer possible to do in uniform."

== Political career ==
During December 1961, as a civilian, Walker began a career making political speeches along with Billy James Hargis. Walker enjoyed enthusiastic crowds all over the United States and his anti-communist message was popular. He also promoted the McCarthyist belief that communists were inside the United States government. Walker's home base was Dallas, Texas, where he received considerable assistance from oil billionaire, publisher and radio host H. L. Hunt. Hunt assisted Walker's first campaign for governor of Texas. A Newsweek cover proclaimed Walker the public face of the anti-communist conservative movement. Mayor of Dallas, Earle Cabell, declared Walker an honorary citizen of Dallas and presented him with a cowboy hat during an event at the Memorial Auditorium.

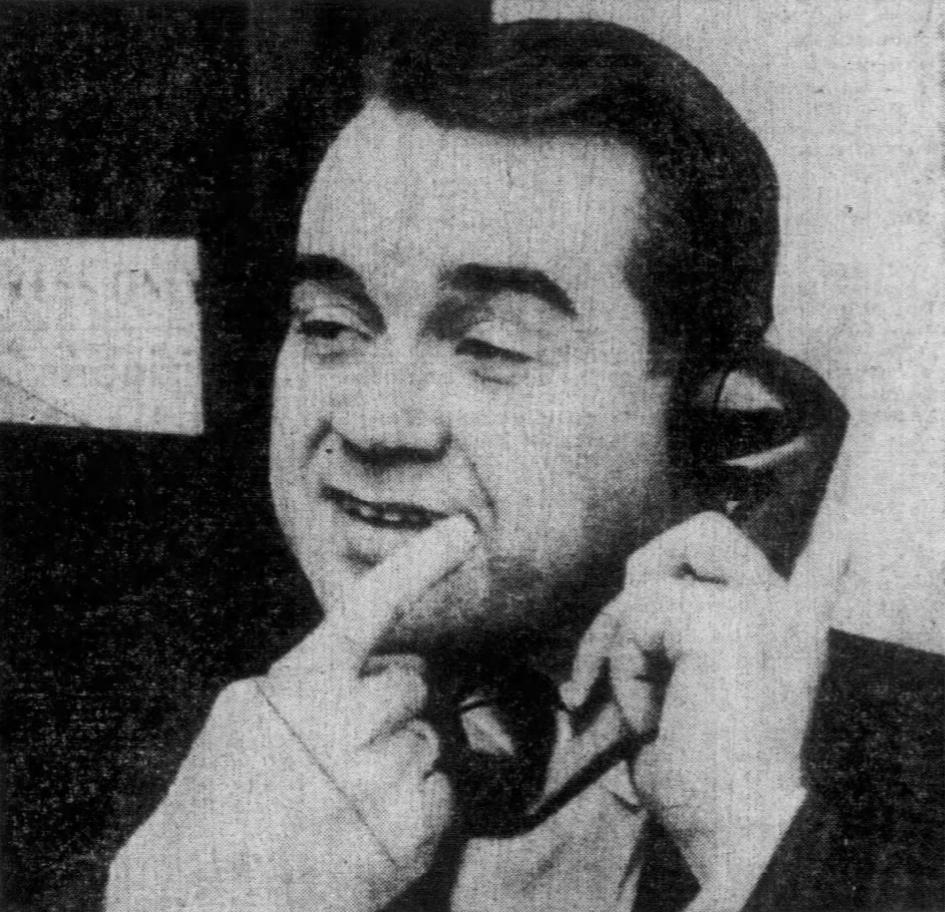
Tom Kelly after Walker hit him

In February 1962, Walker began his campaign for governor, but finished last among six candidates in a Democratic primary election. The winner in a runoff election was John B. Connally, Jr., the choice of Vice President Lyndon B. Johnson. Other contenders were Governor Price Daniel, Highway Commissioner Marshall Formby of Plainview, Attorney General of Texas Will Wilson, and Houston lawyer Don Yarborough, the favorite of liberals and organized labor. Because of disfranchisement of minorities in Texas since the beginning of the century, Democratic Party primaries were the only strongly competitive political contests in the state at that time. In the course of his campaign, Walker assaulted journalist Tom Kelly (father of journalist and editor Michael Kelly), who had asked him for a response to praise of Walker from American Nazi Party leader George Lincoln Rockwell; Walker's response was to strike Kelly in the left eye, an attack that was widely reported in the press.

Though Walker had obeyed orders during the desegregation of Central High School in Little Rock, he acted privately in organizing protests in September 1962 against the enrollment of James Meredith, an African-American veteran, at the all-white University of Mississippi.

On September 26, 1962, Walker broadcast this message on several radio stations:

Mississippi: It is time to move. We have talked, listened and been pushed around far too much by the anti-Christ Supreme Court! Rise...to a stand beside Governor Ross Barnett at Jackson, Mississippi! Now is the time to be heard! Thousands strong from every State in the Union! Rally to the cause of freedom! The Battle Cry of the Republic! Barnett yes! Castro no! Bring your flag, your tent and your skillet. It's now or never! The time is when the President of the United States commits or uses any troops, Federal or State, in Mississippi! The last time in such a situation I was on the wrong side. That was in Little Rock, Arkansas in 1957-1958. This time – out of uniform – I am on the right side! I will be there!

On September 29, 1962, he issued a televised statement:

This is Edwin A. Walker. I am in Mississippi beside Governor Ross Barnett. I call for a national protest against the conspiracy from within. Rally to the cause of freedom in righteous indignation, violent vocal protest, and bitter silence under the flag of Mississippi at the use of Federal troops. This today is a disgrace to the nation in "dire peril", a disgrace beyond the capacity of anyone except its enemies. This is the conspiracy of the crucifixion by anti-Christ conspirators of the Supreme Court in their denial of prayer and their betrayal of a nation.

White segregationists from around the state joined students and locals in a violent, 15-hour riot on the campus on September 30. Two people were killed execution-style, hundreds were wounded, and six federal marshals were shot. Walker was arrested on four federal charges, including sedition and insurrection against the United States. He was temporarily detained in a mental institution on orders from Attorney General Robert F. Kennedy, who demanded that Walker receive a 90-day psychiatric examination.

The attorney general's decision was challenged by noted psychiatrist Thomas Szasz, who insisted that psychiatry must never become used for political rivalry. The American Civil Liberties Union joined Szasz in a protest against the attorney general, completing this coalition of liberal and conservative leaders. The attorney general had to relent, and Walker spent only five days in the asylum.

Walker posted bond and returned home to Dallas, where he was greeted by a crowd of some 200 devotees. After a federal grand jury adjourned in January 1963 without indicting him, the charges were dismissed. Because the dismissal of the charges was without prejudice, the charges could have been reinstated within five years.

== Warren Commission ==
In February 1963, Walker joined Billy James Hargis on an anticommunist tour named "Operation Midnight Ride." In a March 5 speech, Walker called on the American military to "liquidate the [communist] scourge that has descended upon the island of Cuba." Seven days later, Lee Harvey Oswald ordered a Carcano rifle by mail using the alias A. Hidell.

While initially skeptical about the photographic evidence provided by the FBI, the Warren Commission reported that Oswald photographed Walker's Dallas home on the weekend of March 9–10, 1963. Oswald's friend, 51-year-old Russian émigré and petroleum geologist George de Mohrenschildt, would later tell the Warren Commission that he "knew that Oswald disliked General Walker."

On April 10, 1963, as Walker was sitting at a desk in his dining room, a bullet struck the wooden frame of his dining-room window. Walker was injured in the forearm by fragments. Marina Oswald later testified that her husband had told her that he traveled by bus to General Walker's house and shot at Walker with his rifle. Marina said Oswald considered Walker to be the leader of a "fascist organization."

Police detective D. E. McElroy commented, "Whoever shot at the general was playing for keeps. The sniper wasn't trying to scare him. He was shooting to kill." The bullet was too badly damaged to provide conclusive ballistics tests, but neutron activation analysis tests later determined that it was "extremely likely" that the bullet was manufactured by the Western Cartridge Company and was the same type of ammunition as was used in the Kennedy assassination.

A note that Oswald left for Marina on the night of the attempt with instructions for her should he not return was not found until ten days after the assassination. Marina Oswald stated later that she had seen Oswald burn most of his plans in the bathtub, though she hid the note that he had left for her in a cookbook, with the intention of bringing it to the police should Oswald again attempt to kill Walker or anyone else. Marina later quoted her husband as saying, "Well, what would you say if somebody got rid of Hitler at the right time? So if you don't know about General Walker, how can you speak up on his behalf?"

The Warren Commission questioned Walker about an interview that he had granted on November 22 in Shreveport, Louisiana that appeared in the November 29, 1963 edition of the extreme-right German newspaper Deutsche National-Zeitung, in which Walker accused Oswald of having attempted to kill him. Marina Oswald was asked about the report during a two-week-long detention in which she was interrogated by federal investigators, and she said that she believed that the report was true.

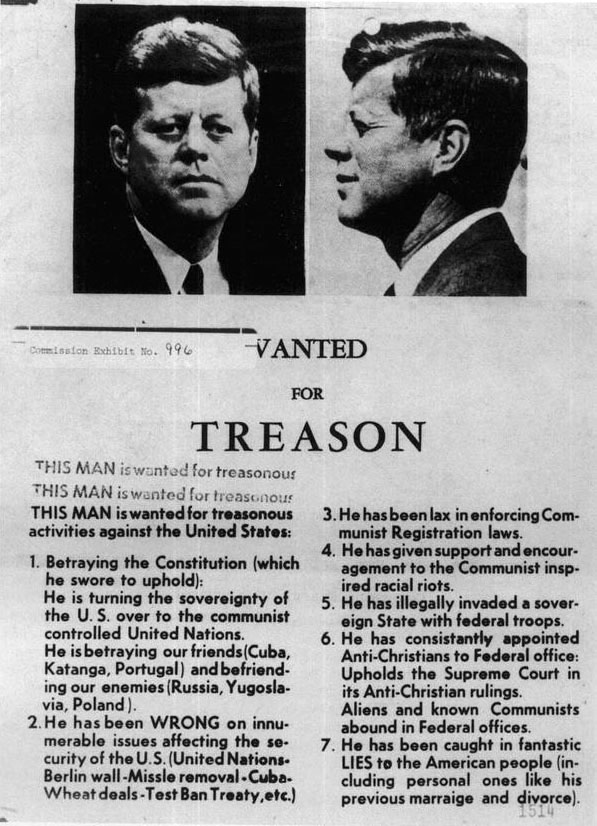
Walker sponsored handbill

Walker organized an October 24, 1963, UN Day attack on Adlai Stevenson, American ambassador to the United Nations, in Dallas. In mid-October 1963, Walker rented the same Dallas Memorial Auditorium in which Stevenson would later speak. He promoted his opposition event as "US Day" and he invited members of the John Birch Society, the National Indignation Convention, the Minutemen and other organizations opposed to communism and the United Nations.

The verbal attacks on Stevenson were traced to plans organized by Walker and his devotees in the John Birch Society, according to the November issue of the magazine Texas Observer. On November 22, a black-bordered advertisement ran in the Dallas Morning News and "Wanted for Treason: JFK" handbills appeared on the streets. They were traced to Walker and his associate Robert Surrey by the Warren Commission. After the assassination, Walker wrote and spoke publicly about his belief that there were two assassins at the "April Crime", Oswald and another person who was never found.

Immediately after the Warren Commission released its report in September 1964, Walker described it as a "farcical whitewash." Although he accepted the commission's finding that it had been Oswald who had shot at him the previous year, Walker claimed that the commission was attempting to hide "some sort of conspiracy" that included an association between Jack Ruby and Oswald.

== Associated Press v. Walker ==
Angered by negative publicity, Walker began to file libel lawsuits against various media outlets. One suit responded to negative coverage of his role in the riot at the University of Mississippi protesting Meredith's admission. The Associated Press reported that Walker had "led a charge of students against federal marshals" and that he had "assumed command of the crowd." Several newspapers were named in the lawsuit. If successful, Walker could have been awarded tens of millions of dollars. A 1964 Texas trial court found the statements to be false and defamatory. By then, Walker and his lawyers had already been awarded more than $3 million from other lawsuits.

The Associated Press appealed the decision as Associated Press v. Walker, eventually to the United States Supreme Court, where it was consolidated with Curtis Publishing Co. v. Butts. In 1967, the Supreme Court ruled against Walker and found that although the statements might have been false, the Associated Press was not guilty of reckless disregard in its reporting about Walker. The court, which had previously said that public officials could not recover damages unless they could prove malice, extended it to public figures as well.

== Arrest and conviction ==
By resigning instead of retiring, Walker became ineligible for an Army pension. He made statements at the time to the Dallas Morning News that he had "refused" his pension. However, he had made several previous requests for his pension dating back to 1973. The army restored his pension rights in 1982.

Walker, at age 66, was arrested on June 23, 1976, for fondling and propositioning a male undercover police officer in a public restroom in a Dallas park and charged with public lewdness. He was arrested again in Dallas for public lewdness on March 16, 1977. He pleaded no contest to one of the two misdemeanor charges, and was convicted and given a prison sentence, which the judge suspended. He was also fined $1,000.

Walker, a heavy smoker, died of lung cancer at his home in Dallas on Halloween 1993. He never married and did not have any children.

== Walker in fiction ==
- Together with Air Force general Curtis LeMay, Walker was said to have inspired the character of the Air Force general James Mattoon Scott (played by Burt Lancaster) of the movie Seven Days in May; Walker is also referred to in the movie. He is also said to have inspired the character of General Jack D. Ripper (played by Sterling Hayden) in Stanley Kubrick's anti-war movie Dr. Strangelove.
- Laugh-In character General Bull Right, played by host Dan Rowan, was partly inspired by Walker.
- Cameron Mitchell portrayed Walker as a supporting character in the 1985 film Prince Jack. It includes Walker's perspective in a dramatization of Oswald's assassination attempt against him.
- Oswald's attempted assassination of Walker is part of 11/22/63, a novel by Stephen King about a time traveler who tries to prevent the Kennedy assassination. In 11.22.63, a television adaptation of King's novel, Walker was portrayed by Gregory North.
- Oswald's assassination attempt of Walker is also part of The Third Bullet, a Bob Lee Swagger novel by Stephen Hunter.
- Walker is a character in The Bettor, an alternative history novel by Tim Parise, in which he is described as attempting to stage a coup by seizing control of the Pentagon during anti-communist riots in 1967.
- The assassination attempt of Walker is also a key plot element in the 1988 novel Libra by Don Delillo, which presents an imagined account of Oswald's life and the CIA conspiracy to assassinate President Kennedy.

== Military awards ==
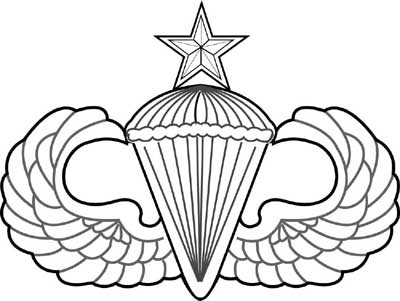
Combat Infantryman Badge with star for Second Award
Senior Parachutist Badge

Silver Star
Legion of Merit with Oak Leaf Cluster
Bronze Star with Oak Leaf Cluster and "V" Device
Army Commendation Medal with Oak Leaf Cluster
American Defense Service Medal
American Campaign Medal
Asiatic-Pacific Campaign Medal
European-African-Middle Eastern Campaign Medal with five service stars
World War II Victory Medal
Army of Occupation Medal
Korean Service Medal with four service stars
National Defense Service Medal with Oak Leaf Cluster
French Croix de guerre 1939-1945 with Palm
Order of the British Empire
Republic of Korea Presidential Unit Citation
United Nations Korea Medal
