= Timeline of the John F. Kennedy assassination =

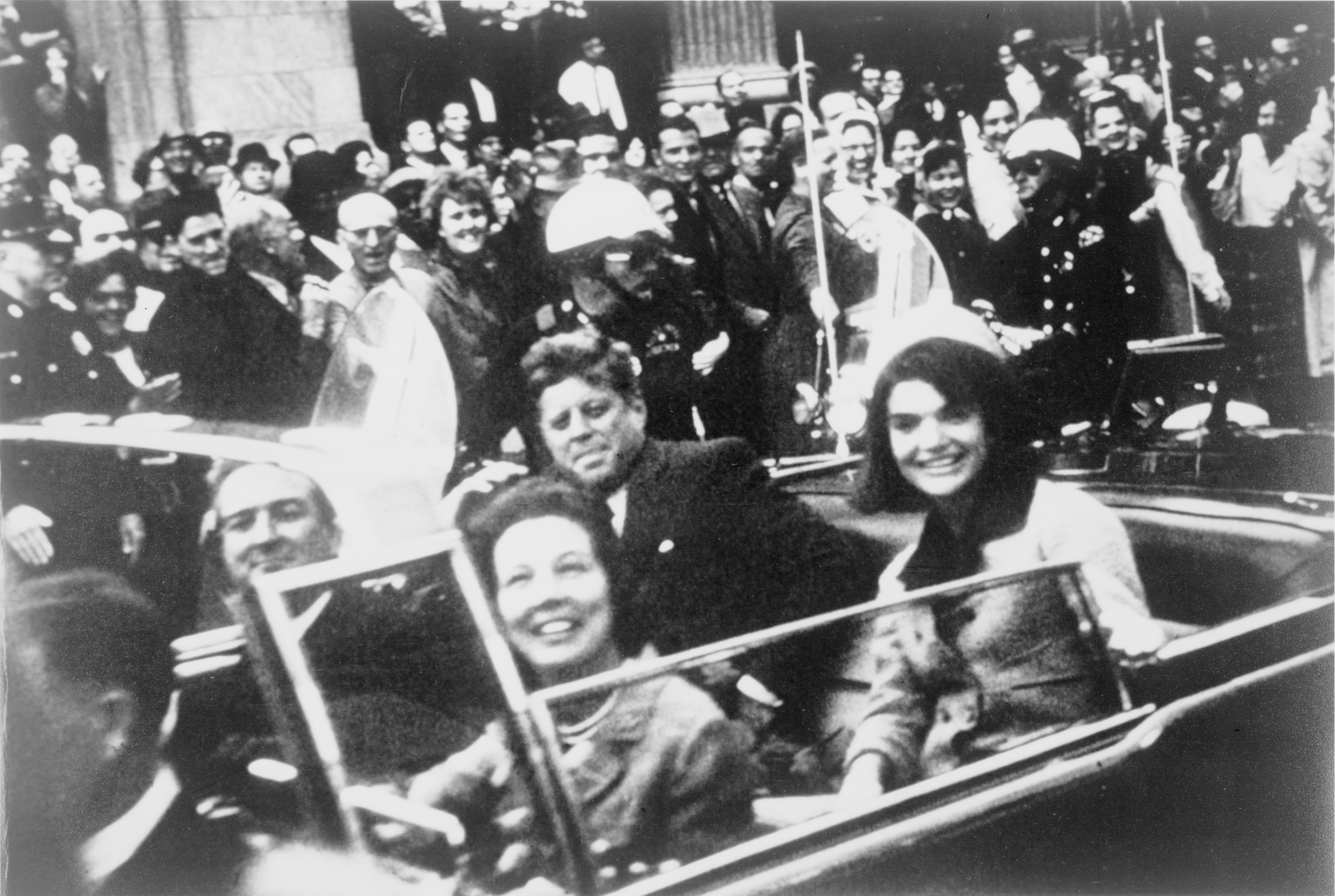
United States President John F. Kennedy, Jacqueline Kennedy, Texas Governor John Connally and Nellie Connally minutes before the assassination

This article outlines the timeline of events before, during, and after the assassination of John F. Kennedy, the 35th president of the United States.

== Prelude ==
=== Events before 1963 (1956–1962) ===
October 24, 1956: Lee Harvey Oswald drops out of high school and joins the U.S. Marine Corps, where he is trained as a sharpshooter.

October 31, 1959: Oswald defects to the Soviet Union and is sent to work at an electronics factory in Minsk.

November 8, 1960: John F. Kennedy wins the 1960 United States presidential election.

June 13, 1962: Oswald returns to the United States with his wife Marina and their child to live in Texas.

October 9, 1962: Oswald rents P.O. Box 2915 under his real name at the Dallas post office. He will maintain the rental until May 14, 1963.

November 6, 1962: Democrat John Connally is elected governor of Texas.

=== Events leading up to the assassination (1963) ===
==== January ====
January 15: Connally takes the oath as governor of Texas. As governor, he will assist with planning for President Kennedy's trip to Texas and will serve as Kennedy's host.

==== February ====
February 22: Ruth Paine meets the Oswalds at a party held at Everett Glover's house.

==== March ====
March 13: Klein's Sporting Goods of Chicago receives a mail order in the amount of $21.45 ($19.95 plus $1.50 for postage and handing) for item C20-750, a World War II-surplus Italian 1891 Carcano Model 1938 rifle equipped with a 4× scope that was advertised in the February 1963 issue of American Rifleman. The name on the order slip is A. Hidell, an alias used by Oswald, and the delivery address is Oswald's Dallas post-office box. The rifle sent to Oswald bears serial number C2766.

March 17: Marina Oswald sends a letter to the Soviet embassy in Washington, D.C., asking to be granted an entrance visa to the USSR. Oswald is given notice in the latter part of March that he will be terminated from his job.

==== April ====
April 6: Oswald works his last day at Jaggars-Chiles-Stovall.

April 10: Oswald fires a bullet that narrowly misses retired general Edwin Walker, a strongly anticommunist right-wing advocate. The police determine that the shot was fired from a distance of less than 40 yards. The case remained unsolved until two weeks after Oswald's death when Marina Oswald informed the FBI that it may have been her husband who had fired the shot.

April 23: Vice President Lyndon B. Johnson, a Texas native, tells reporters in Dallas that President Kennedy may visit Texas sometime that summer. Johnson hopes that Kennedy's schedule would allow him to have a breakfast in Fort Worth, a luncheon in Dallas, an afternoon tea in San Antonio and dinner in Houston.

April 24: In the late evening, Oswald leaves Dallas by bus for his hometown of New Orleans, seeking better employment opportunities.

==== June ====
June 5: President Kennedy, Johnson and Connally are together in a meeting in El Paso when they agree to a second presidential visit to Texas later that year.

June 6: Kennedy decides to embark on the Texas trip with three basic goals in mind: to raise more Democratic Party presidential campaign fund contributions, to begin his quest for reelection in November 1964 and, because the Kennedy-Johnson ticket had barely won Texas in 1960 (and had even lost in Dallas), to mend political fences among several leading Texas Democratic Party members who appear to be fighting politically against themselves.

June 24: Oswald applies for a U.S. passport in New Orleans, Louisiana, stating that he intends to depart from New Orleans during the period from October to December 1963 for proposed travel as a tourist for a duration of between three months and one year. The next day, he is issued U.S. Passport DO 92526, which will be valid for three years to all countries except Albania, Cuba and those portions of China, Korea and Vietnam that are under communist control.

==== September ====
September 17: Jack Valenti sends an invitation to the White House asking whether President Kennedy would attend a dinner in Houston on November 21 honoring congressman Albert Thomas for his decision not to retire from Congress. The invitation is received at the White House on September 19, 1963. Oswald is issued a 15-day Mexican tourist card using the name "LEE, Harvey Oswald."

September 23: Ruth Paine drives Marina Oswald from New Orleans back to her home in Irving, Texas. Late that night, Lee Oswald also leaves New Orleans to travel to Mexico City hoping to somehow gain entrance to Cuba, a country to which travel has been banned by the United States.

September 24: At a press conference in Austin, Governor Connally announces that he will visit Washington, D.C., from October 2–4, 1963 and that he hopes to see President Kennedy. Connally says that has no plans to invite Kennedy to visit Texas but would be delighted if the president would agree to a visit.

The White House accepts the invitation to the Albert Thomas dinner in Houston and turns it into a two-day political trip encompassing the major cities of Texas. Although Kennedy had wanted to visit Texas at some point, he had not originally planned to go there in November.

September 25: White House sources, in an exclusive to The Dallas Morning News, announce that the president will visit Texas November 21–22, 1963 and that the tour will include Dallas.

September 26: The Dallas Morning News is the first newspaper to announce the Texas visit in an article covering the president's conservation tour in Jackson Hole, Wyoming.

September 27: Lee Oswald arrives in Mexico City and registers at the Hotel del Comercio. He visits the Cuban consulate three times in an attempt to secure a visa to Cuba, as well as the Soviet embassy to obtain a visa, but is denied at both places.

September 30: Lee Oswald purchases a bus ticket using the alias "Mr. H. O. Lee." The bus leaves Mexico City for Laredo, Texas at 8:30 a.m. on October 2.

==== October ====
October 3: Oswald arrives in Dallas and spends the night at the YMCA.

October 4: Governor Connally meets with President Kennedy at the White House.

Oswald applies for a job at Padgett Printing but is not hired because of a poor recommendation provided by Robert Stovall, president of Jaggars-Chiles-Stovall.

Oswald returns to stay at the Paines' residence in Irving for the weekend.

October 11: Kenneth O'Donnell sends a reply to Jack Valenti formally accepting his invitation for the president to speak at the dinner honoring Rep. Thomas.

October 15: Ruth Paine calls the Texas School Book Depository and arranges for a job interview for Oswald with building superintendent Roy Truly. Truly interviews Oswald later that day and hires him for $1.25 per hour as a temporary clerk filling customer book orders. Oswald starts work the following day. At about the same time, Paine had separated from her husband Michael.

October 20: Kenneth O'Donnell, special assistant and appointments secretary to President Kennedy, calls Jerry Bruno, the advance man for the Kennedy trips, and asks him to come to the White House to discuss the trip to Texas.

October 21: Bruno meets with O'Donnell and is told to contact Walter Jenkins, one of Vice President Lyndon Johnson's top administrative assistants, to solicit his input for the trip.

October 24: Bruno meets with Jenkins, who tells Bruno about the stops that Governor Connally has suggested. The first stop would be to fly to San Antonio on November 21 and drive in a motorcade to Brooks Air Force Base, then fly to Houston and drive in a motorcade to the Rice Hotel, where the Albert Thomas dinner was originally scheduled to take place, and stay overnight at the hotel. Then on the morning of November 22, the president would fly to Fort Worth to receive an honorary degree at Texas Christian University at 9:30 a.m. and then ride in a motorcade for the short distance to Dallas, where he would attend a luncheon at the annual meeting of the Dallas Citizens Council at the Statler Hilton Hotel. Finally, the president would attend a fundraising dinner in Austin before returning to Washington. Jenkins suggests that Bruno visit Texas, meet with Governor Connally and evaluate the sites himself, and also meet with Democratic Texas senator Ralph Yarborough, a bitter political enemy of Connally and Johnson, to avoid any trouble between the two parties on the trip.

United States ambassador to the United Nations Adlai Stevenson II delivers a contentious speech on United Nations Day at the Dallas Memorial Auditorium, where he is booed and heckled. After the speech, he is struck on the head with a picket sign and spit upon. Dallas police would later fear that similar demonstrations might occur when Kennedy visited Dallas. Several people, including Stevenson, warned Kennedy against coming to Dallas, but Kennedy ignored their advice.

October 28: Bruno flies to Austin to begin his evaluation of the stops being considered for the Kennedy visit on November 21–22.

October 29: Bruno meets with Henry Brown, president of the Texas AFL–CIO and a friend of Senator Ralph Yarborough, to obtain his input from labor leaders. He then has lunch with Governor Connally to review his itinerary, which includes an honorary degree from Texas Christian University; because Kennedy is Catholic, Bruno considers this event among the highlights of the trip. Connally informs Bruno that he has assigned different members of his staff to each stop on the itinerary and that they would be in charge of the visit. Bruno tells Connally that he welcomes his input and suggestions, but that the final decisions on the itinerary will be made by the White House.

Governor Connally announces that a "Texas welcome dinner" for Kennedy will be held in Austin on November 22. The governor says that the dinner will be a $100-per-plate event held at 7:30 p.m. at the Austin Municipal Auditorium as a climax to the president's Texas trip. It is sponsored by the state Democratic executive committee. No other plans have been completed except those for the November 21 Albert Thomas appreciation dinner in Houston.

October 30: Bruno and Johnson aide Clifton Carter visit the Texas cities that the president will visit. The San Antonio and Houston sites are checked and confirmed as acceptable, but when visiting Texas Christian University in Fort Worth, Bruno is informed by school officials that the university does not intend to confer an honorary degree to the president and that they have only approved the use of their campus as the location for a speech. Bruno informs Connally of this development, and Connally says that he will meet with the university's board of regents the next night. Bruno travels to Dallas to evaluate the ballroom at the Statler Hilton Hotel where the luncheon is planned to take place on November 22. He is met there by J. Erik Jonsson, chairman of the Dallas Citizens Council (and an owner of Texas Instruments) and Robert B. Cullum, chairman of the Dallas Chamber of Commerce and owner of the Tom Thumb Food Stores. Cullum informs Bruno that the ballroom at the Statler Hilton is now unavailable because organizers of a bottlers' convention had reserved it and would not surrender it. Jonsson and Cullum suggest the Dallas Trade Mart, but after visiting the site, Bruno dislikes the many catwalks that would be above the president, which, in light of the Stevenson incident that had just occurred a few days earlier, could present a security problem. He asks to be shown other available sites in Dallas.

October 31: Bruno visits two other potential luncheon sites, the Dallas Memorial Auditorium, which he deems too large, and the Graduate Research Center of the Southwest, which he believes would be too far out of town and thus impractical. He is also informed that Governor Connally is unhappy with the decision not to use the Trade Mart for the luncheon because of the catwalk issue. Bruno agrees to visit the Trade Mart again but retains his misgivings. Connally telephones that he has met with the TCU board of regents and that they will not confer an honorary degree on the president. Bruno is now faced with two holes in the schedule, Fort Worth and Dallas. One last place is suggested as a luncheon possibility, the Women's Building (now known as the Women's Museum) at the fairgrounds at Fair Park. President Kennedy is asked at a press conference about rumors that Johnson will not be selected as his running mate in the 1964 election, which Kennedy denies.

==== November ====
November 1: Bruno returns to Washington, D.C., with the Dallas luncheon site location still undecided. The Fort Worth visit is eventually resolved when the city's chamber of commerce agrees to sponsor a breakfast for the president. Because of this, the president's overnight stay is changed from Houston to Fort Worth so that he will have time to attend the breakfast.

November 4: Gerald Behn, the Secret Service Special Agent in Charge (SAIC) for the White House detail, telephones Forrest Sorrels, Secret Service SAIC of the Dallas district. He instructs Sorrels to survey the buildings that the president is planning to visit during the Dallas leg of the trip. The two leading contenders to host the Dallas luncheon are the Trade Mart (strongly favored by Governor Connally) and the Women's Building at the state fairgrounds, which Bruno favors and Connally bitterly opposes. Later that day, Sorrels reports back to Behn that the Women's Building appears to be preferable from a security standpoint, but that it is not a suitable place to take the president. He reports that the Trade Mart has about 60 entrances as well as six catwalks over the area where the luncheon would be held, which could pose a problem in adequately staffing the site with security personnel.

White House Secret Service agent Winston Lawson is informed that he has been assigned to the Dallas visit.

November 5: Bruno visits the White House and has separate meetings with Kenneth O'Donnell, Gerald Behn and Walter Jenkins. It is decided that the Trade Mart poses too great a security risk, and the Women's Building is chosen as the Dallas luncheon site.

November 6: White House press secretary Pierre Salinger announces that First Lady Jacqueline Kennedy will accompany the president on his Texas trip.

November 7: The Albert Thomas appreciation dinner to be held on November 21 sells out a second time. Organizers of the dinner had already moved the venue from the Rice Hotel, where the event had sold out, to the larger Sam Houston Coliseum because of increased demand for tickets once it became known that Kennedy would attend. After it was announced that the First Lady would also attend, tickets to the dinner at the larger venue sold out as well.

Bruno composes a proposed schedule for the Texas trip, which includes the Women's Building as the site for the Dallas luncheon.

November 8: It is announced that First Lady Jacqueline Kennedy will begin resuming her official White House duties on November 20, more than a month earlier than expected. She had previously announced the cancellation of all her events for the rest of the year following the premature birth and death of her third child, Patrick Bouvier Kennedy, the past August.

November 9: Oswald is driven by Ruth Paine to take his driver's license permit test, but because there is a special election that day, the office is closed.

Around 2 p.m., Oswald test-drives a new red Mercury Comet Caliente two-door hardtop at a dealership at 118 East Commerce in Dallas. He tells salesman Albert Bogard that he will be back to buy it in two or three weeks when he will have the $300 down payment.

November 12: A special flight carrying all the advance groups that are to work on the preparation for the trip to Houston, San Antonio, Austin, Fort Worth and Dallas departs Andrews Air Force Base at 8:20 a.m.

November 13: Jack Puterbaugh and White House Secret Service agent Winston Lawson, along with Dallas Secret Service agents Forrest Sorrels and Robert Steuart, visit the office of Robert B. Cullum, president of the Dallas Chamber of Commerce, to discuss plans for the Kennedy visit. They reexamine the Trade Mart and the Women's Building and meet with representatives of the Trade Mart.

November 14: Acquiescing to the wishes of Governor Connally, Kenneth O'Donnell reverses his prior decision to hold the Dallas luncheon at the Women's Building and changes the location to the Dallas Trade Mart. According to both O'Donnell and Bruno, this change in the luncheon site, although seemingly insignificant at the time, dramatically alters the motorcade route taken through Dallas.

Oswald appears at the Allright Parking Garage at 1208 Commerce Street to inquire about job openings.

November 15: President Kennedy delivers a speech in New York City at the AFL–CIO convention and then flies to West Palm Beach, Florida to spend his last weekend.

The White House announces that the Dallas Trade Mart will be the site of President Kennedy's luncheon address and that a motorcade will proceed through downtown Dallas. Until that point, there had been speculation in the news media that Kennedy's tight schedule in Texas would not allow enough time for a motorcade through Dallas.

November 16: Dallas civic leaders issue statements urging against demonstrations or incidents that may occur during President Kennedy's visit. Dallas County judge W. L. Sterrett says: "I am hoping we won't have any kind of demonstration here. I have confidence that there won't be anything of that sort. That kind of thing can give a city and county a black eye."

November 18: Kennedy confides to his good friend senator George Smathers of Florida that Vice President Johnson wants First Lady Jacqueline Kennedy to ride in the car with him during the upcoming tour of Texas. The exact motorcade route is finalized.

Dallas police chief Jesse Curry increased the level of security during Kennedy's visit; he put into effect the most stringent security precautions in the city's history. Curry even deputized citizens to take action for any suspicious acts that could endanger the president.

November 19: The White House formally announces the timetable of events for the president's visit, including a planned arrival time of 12:30 p.m. CST at the Trade Mart.

November 21: At 11:07 p.m., Air Force One lands at Carswell Air Force Base on the outskirts of Fort Worth, Texas. The president and his wife are met by Raymond Buck, president of the Fort Worth Chamber of Commerce, and his wife. Air Force Two also lands at Carswell with the vice president Lyndon Johnson, Texas governor John Connally and Senator Ralph Yarborough. Connally and Yarborough dislike each other so much Yarborough is unwilling to travel in the same car with Johnson, who is an ally of Connally. The following day, the president instructs him to ride with Johnson.

At 11:35 p.m., the Kennedys arrive at the Hotel Texas in Fort Worth, after being cheered by well-wishers lined on the route toward the West Freeway. The president and Mrs. Kennedy shake hands with admirers gathered outside the hotel before retiring to their assigned suite (Room 850) for the night.

== Friday, November 22, 1963 ==
All timestamps in Central Standard Time (CST) unless otherwise stated.

=== Events preceding the assassination (7 a.m. – 12:29 p.m.) ===
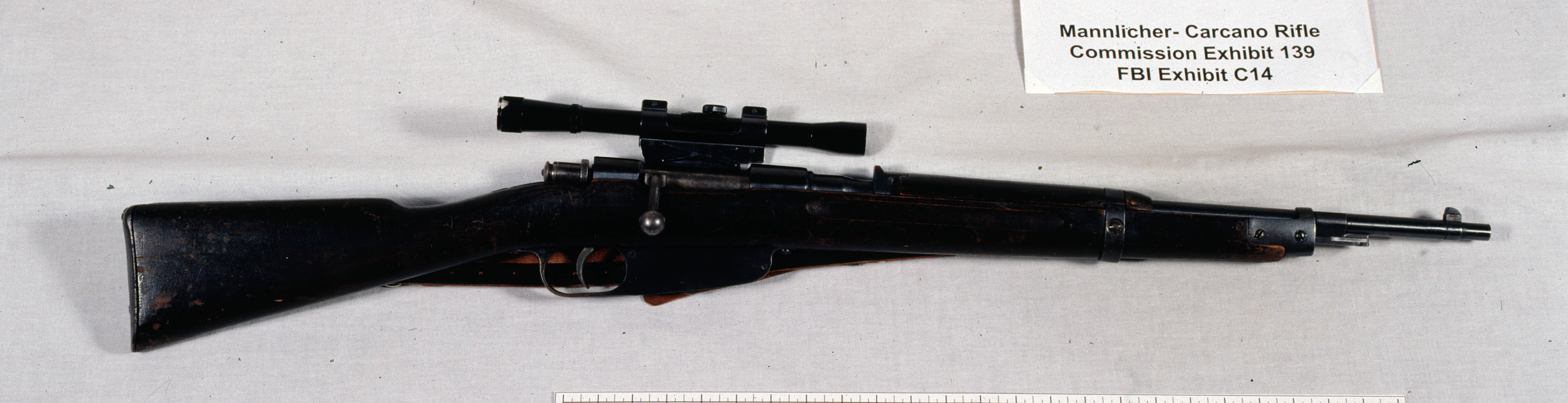
The Mannlicher-Carcano rifle owned by Lee Harvey Oswald, used to assassinate President John F. Kennedy.

7:23 a.m.: Oswald goes to work at the Texas School Book Depository in Dallas, with Buell Wesley Frazier, a young worker there. Frazier asks about the long, paper-wrapped package in Oswald’s arms, to which Oswald says: “Oh, just some curtains.”

8:45 a.m.: The president speaks before breakfast in a square across Eighth Street. The attendees, members of the Fort Worth Chamber of Commerce, are largely conservative Republicans.

9:10 a.m.: Kennedy takes his place in the Hotel Texas' grand ballroom for a scheduled speech. Afterwards, presidential adviser Kenny O'Donnell informs Roy Kellerman, the Secret Service agent in charge of the trip, that the presidential limousine should not be equipped with its bubbletop if the weather is clear in Dallas. Later, assistant (now-ranking), press secretary Malcolm Kilduff shows the Kennedys a negative advertisement published in The Dallas Morning News with the headline "Welcome Mr. Kennedy to Dallas." Kennedy tells his wife: "We're heading into nut country today."

10:40 a.m.: Kennedy's motorcade departs Hotel Texas for Carswell Air Force Base.

11:20 a.m.: Air Force One departs Carswell Air Force Base for Dallas, Texas.

11:35 a.m.: Air Force Two arrives at Love Field in Dallas.

11:38 a.m.: Air Force One arrives at Love Field in Dallas.

11:44 a.m.: The Kennedys and Connallys disembark Air Force One and are greeted by the Johnsons. The motorcade cars had been lined up in order earlier that morning.

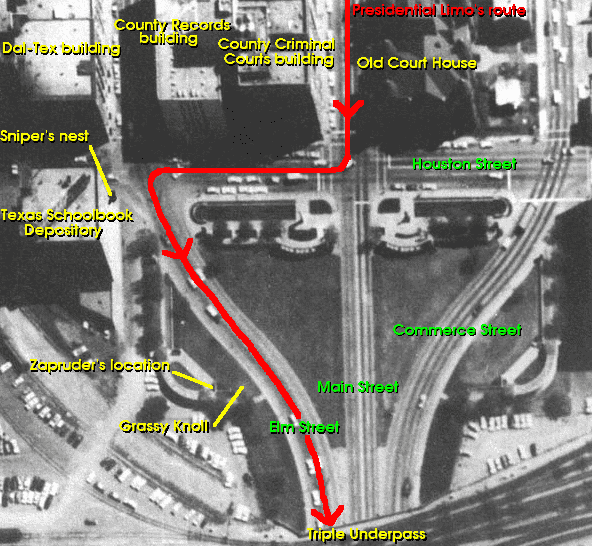
The route taken by the motorcade within Dealey Plaza. North is towards the almost direct-left. This exact route cannot be driven today as several of the roads have changed.

11:55 a.m.: The motorcade departs Love Field about 15 minutes after the party had arrived, after the president and his wife take time to shake hands with many of the enthusiastic supporters. The motorcade leaves Love Field for its 10-mile trip through downtown Dallas. The motorcade route took a left turn from the south end of Love Field to West Mockingbird Lane and continued through to central Dallas. It progressed down Main Street.

12:29 p.m.: Motorcade turned right (westbound) into Houston Street, entering Dealey Plaza. The motorcade approached the Texas School Book Depository.

=== The assassination (12:30 p.m.) ===
12:30 p.m.: Motorcade made a sharp 135-degree left turn onto Elm Street, a downward-sloping road. The giant Hertz Rent-a-Car clock on top of the building was seen to change from 12:29 to 12:30 as the limousine turned onto Elm Street.

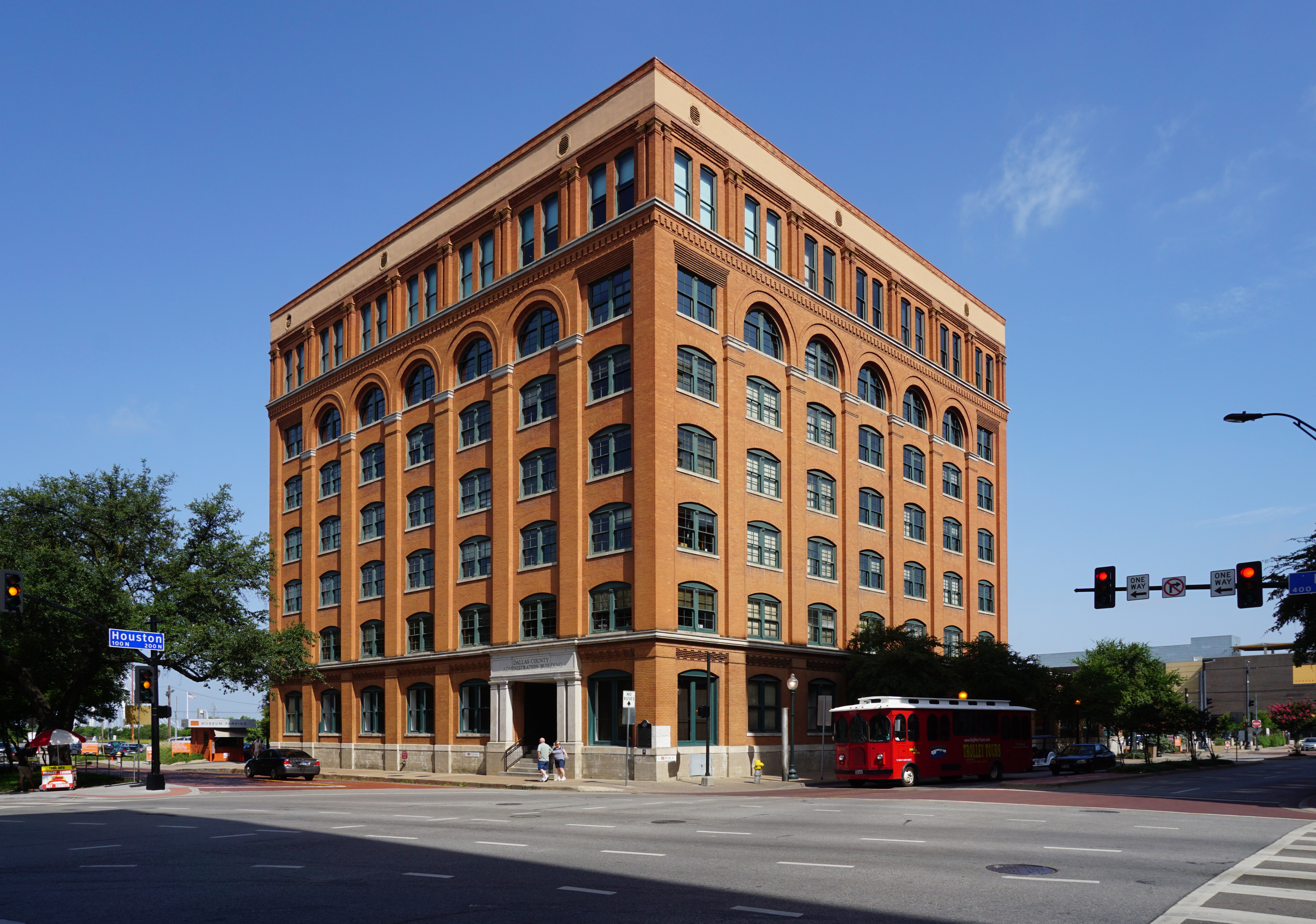
The Texas School Book Depository, where Oswald shot President Kennedy while he was en route to the Dallas Trade Mart at 12:30 p.m. on November 22, 1963. 3 minutes after shooting the president, Oswald managed to escape via the front doors of the building.

Witnesses recalled the first shot was fired after the president had started waving with his right hand. Onlookers recalled hearing three shots. The Zapruder film shows the president reemerging after being temporarily hidden from view by the Stemmons Freeway sign at film frames 215–223, and his mouth has already opened wide in an anguished expression by frame 225. He has already been impacted by a bullet that struck him in the back and exited his throat, his hands clenched into fists. He then raises his fists in front of his face and throat as he turns to the left toward his wife. Connally is also hit. Secret Service Agent Clint Hill testified he heard one shot, then jumped off the running board of the Secret Service follow-up car directly behind Kennedy, at the equivalent of frame 308; about a quarter of a second before the president's head exploded at frame 313. Hill then rapidly ran towards the Presidential limo. The three shots were fired in a timespan estimated to be from 4.8 to 7.9 seconds.

The Warren Commission report states that seconds after the shooting Roy Kellerman consulted his watch and said "12:30" to William Greer, before he radioed to Police Chief Jesse Curry that the President had been shot. Curry then communicated an order for Parkland Hospital to stand by – the Dallas police radio log reflects that this communication was made at 12:30.

As the limousine began speeding up, Mrs. Kennedy was heard to scream and she climbed onto the rear of the limo. At the same time, Hill managed to climb aboard and hang onto the suddenly accelerating limo, and Mrs. Kennedy returned to the back seat. Hill then shielded her and the President. The Connallys stated they heard Mrs. Kennedy say, "I have his brains in my hand!". The limo driver and police motorcycles turned on their sirens and raced at an estimated 80 miles per hour (130 km/h) to Parkland Memorial Hospital, along Stemmons Freeway and Harry Hines Boulevard, approximately four miles away. A photograph by Dallas photographer Mel McIntyre shows the limo west of the triple underpass and approaching the ramp to Stemmons Freeway, with the Hertz Rent-a-Car clock in the background still showing the time as "12:30".

=== Aftermath of the assassination (12:31 p.m. – 11:30 p.m.) ===
12:33 p.m.: Oswald left the building through its front door. He had been confronted by patrolman Marion Baker and Depository superintendent Roy Truly in the second-floor lunchroom. Baker let Oswald pass after Truly identified Oswald as an employee. Oswald was next seen by a secretary as he crossed through the second-floor business office. He left the building through its front door at approximately 12:33 p.m. Initially, Truly and Occhus Campbell, the Depository's vice president, said that they had seen Oswald in the first-floor storage room. When asked during his interrogations about his whereabouts, Oswald claimed that he "went outside to watch P. Parade" (referring to the presidential motorcade), was "out with [William Shelley, a foreman at the depository] in front" and that he was at the "front entrance to the first floor" when he encountered a policeman.

12:34 p.m.: United Press International reporter Merriman Smith reported from a press car with a radiotelephone while travelling with the motorcade: "Three shots were fired today at the president's motorcade in downtown Dallas." Smith stayed on the phone as Jack Bell, an Associated Press reporter in the car, started punching Smith and yelling at him to hand over the phone. Smith would win the 1964 Pulitzer Prize for his coverage of the assassination.

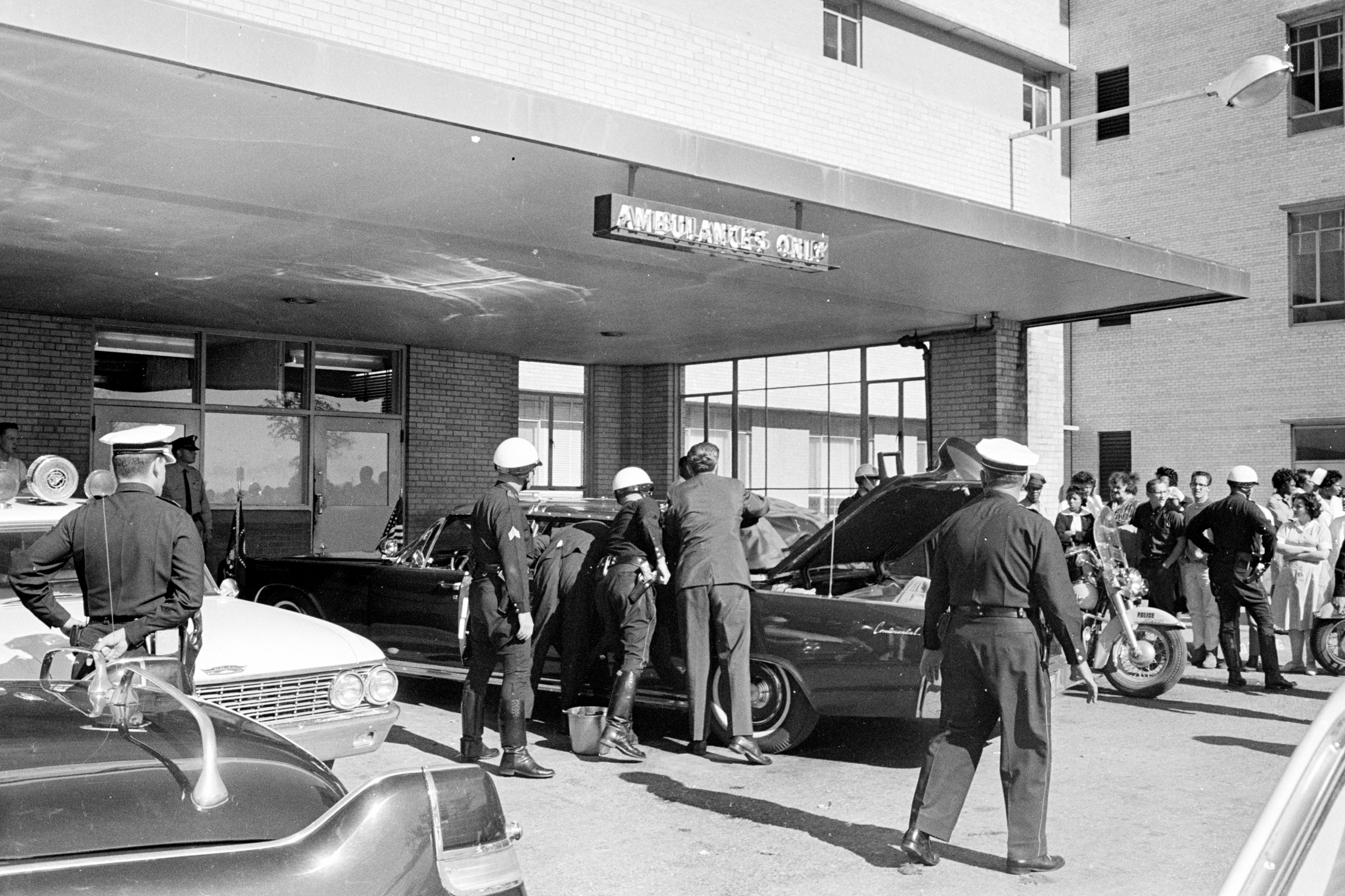
Parkland Hospital, the hospital President Kennedy was rushed to shortly after being shot by Oswald. He was pronounced dead at 1:00 p.m. in Trauma Room 1, 30 minutes after being shot.

12:36 p.m.: President Kennedy's limousine arrives at Parkland Memorial Hospital. Parkland Hospital admitted Kennedy and Connally and immediately began treatment. Malcolm Perry, assistant professor of surgery at the University of Texas Southwestern Medical Center and a vascular surgeon, was the first to treat Kennedy. Perry performed a tracheotomy followed by cardiopulmonary resuscitation performed with another surgeon. Other doctors and surgeons worked frantically to save the president's life, but the wounds were too severe.

12:40 p.m.: Viewers of the live soap opera As the World Turns receive the first national television report of the shooting from CBS News anchorman, Walter Cronkite.

12:45 p.m.: Dan Rather of CBS calls Parkland Memorial Hospital; a doctor there tells him he believes Kennedy is dead.

12:33 to 12:50 p.m.: Estimates of when the depository building was sealed off by police range from 12:33 to 12:50 p.m. The streets in and around Dealey Plaza were not immediately closed, and photos taken nine minutes after the assassination show vehicles still driving on Elm Street in front of Depository.

12:50 p.m.: Kennedy's top military aide General Godfrey McHugh calls Air Force One from Parkland to state that they will soon be leaving for Andrews Air Force Base.

1:00 p.m.: President Kennedy is officially pronounced dead. Those who had treated Kennedy observed the president's condition was "moribund", meaning he had no chance of survival upon arrival at the hospital. "I am absolutely sure he never knew what hit him.", said Tom Shires, Parkland's chief of surgery. Father Oscar Huber of Holy Trinity Catholic Church of Dallas administered the last rites to the president. Huber had needed to temporarily remove a sheet covering Kennedy's face so the last rites could be performed. Connally was taken to emergency surgery, where he underwent two operations.

After receiving word of the president's death, acting White House press secretary Malcolm Kilduff entered the hospital room where new president Johnson and his wife were sitting. Kilduff said, "Mr. President, I have to announce the death of President Kennedy. Is it OK with you that the announcement be made now?" Johnson ordered the announcement be made only after he left the hospital. When asking that the announcement be delayed, Johnson told Kilduff: "I think I had better get out of here...before you announce it. We don't know whether this is a worldwide conspiracy, whether they are after me as well as they were after President Kennedy, or whether they are after Speaker [John W.] McCormack or Senator [Carl] Hayden. We just don't know." He later recounted to Merle Miller: "I asked that the announcement be made after we had left the room...so that if it were an international conspiracy and they were out to destroy our form of government and the leaders in that government, that we would minimize the opportunity for doing so."

After leaving the depository, Oswald walked seven blocks before boarding a bus. When the bus became ensnarled in traffic, he exited the bus, walked to a nearby bus station, and hired a taxi. He asked the driver to stop several blocks past his rooming house at 1026 North Beckley Avenue, and he then walked back to the house. He arrived there at around 1:00 p.m.

1:04 p.m.: According to housekeeper Earlene Roberts, Oswald departed three or four minutes after arriving at the rooming house. She last saw him standing at a bus stop outside the house.

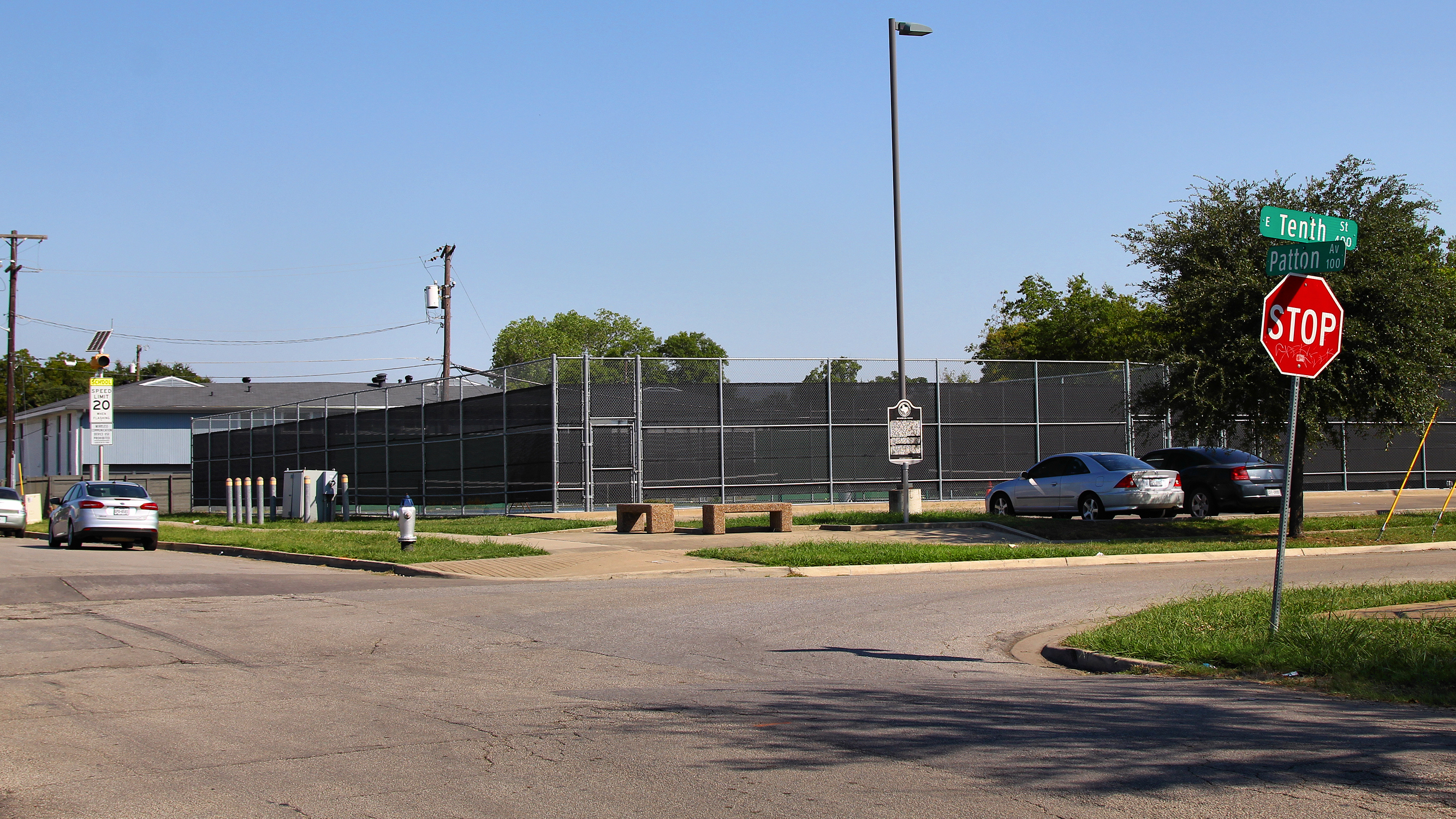
The corner of Tenth Street and Patton Avenue in the Oak Cliff neighborhood of Dallas, Texas, United States, where Officer J. D. Tippit was shot and killed by Lee Harvey Oswald after Oswald assassinated President John F. Kennedy.

1:15 p.m.: Oswald shot and killed Dallas police officer J. D. Tippit near the intersection of 10th Street and Patton Avenue with a Smith & Wesson Victory Model .38 Special revolver, 0.86 miles from the rooming house. Thirteen people witnessed Oswald shooting Tippit or fleeing the immediate scene. By that evening, five witnesses had identified Oswald in police lineups.

1:16 p.m.: The first report that Police Officer Tippit has been shot.

1:26 p.m.: Lyndon Johnson departs Parkland Memorial Hospital for Love Field.

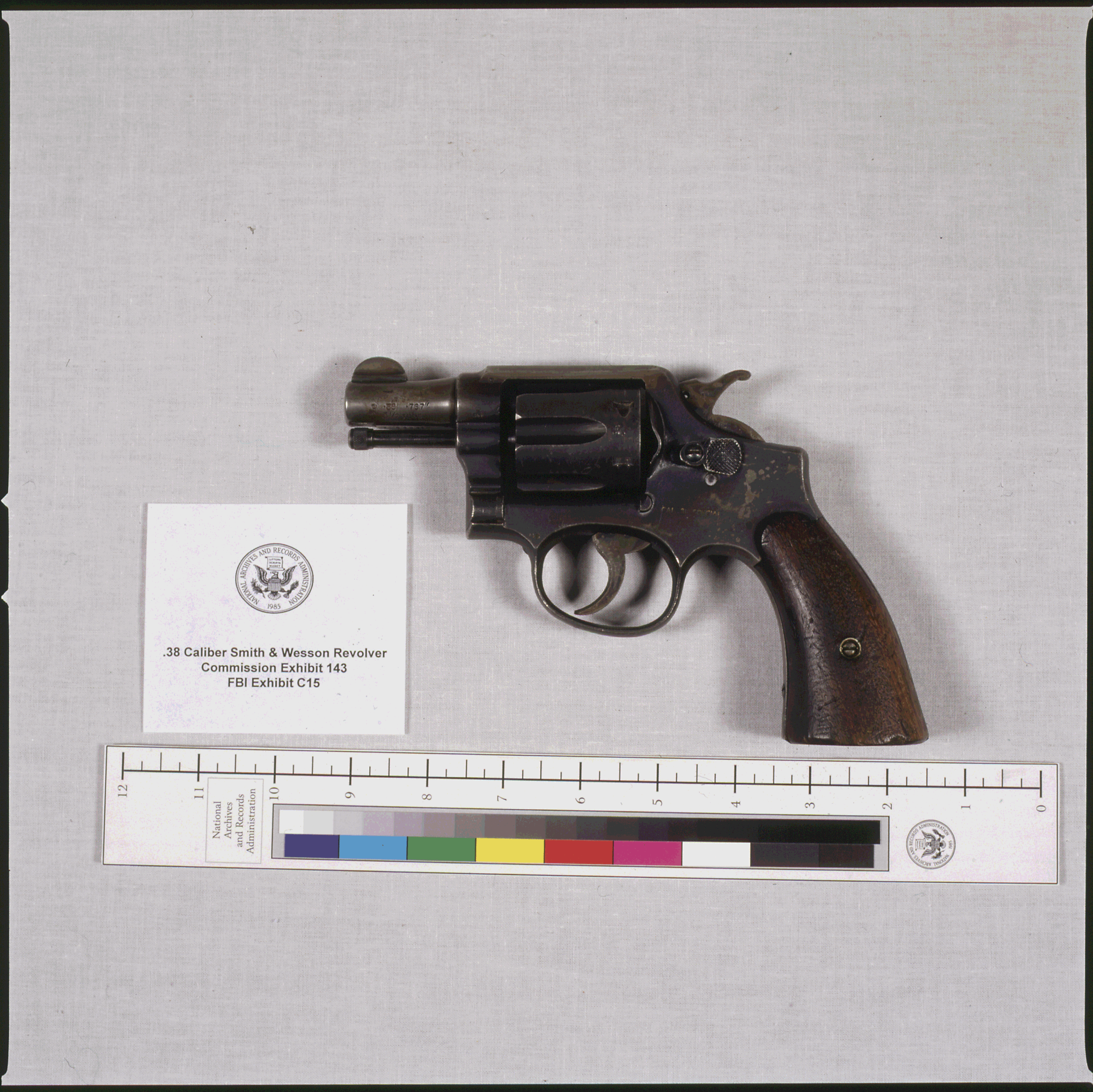
The .38 Caliber Revolver belonging to Lee Harvey Oswald that was allegedly used to Shoot Dallas Policeman J. D. Tippit on November 22, 1963.

1:30 p.m.: Johnson, protected by Rufus Youngblood in a car driven by Jesse Curry, along with passengers Congressmen Albert Thomas and Homer Thornberry, arrives at Air Force One. Lady Bird Johnson, Congressman Jack Brooks, and three members of the Secret Service also arrive in a second car, and Jack Valenti, Lem Johns, Cliff Carter, and Cecil Stoughton arrive in a third. They are followed by additional cars containing officials and aides for both Kennedy and Johnson.

1:33 p.m.: White House Assistant Press Secretary Malcolm Kilduff announces at Parkland Memorial Hospital that Kennedy is dead.

President John F. Kennedy died at approximately 1:00 CST today, here in Dallas. He died of a gunshot wound to the brain. I have no other details regarding the assassination of the president.

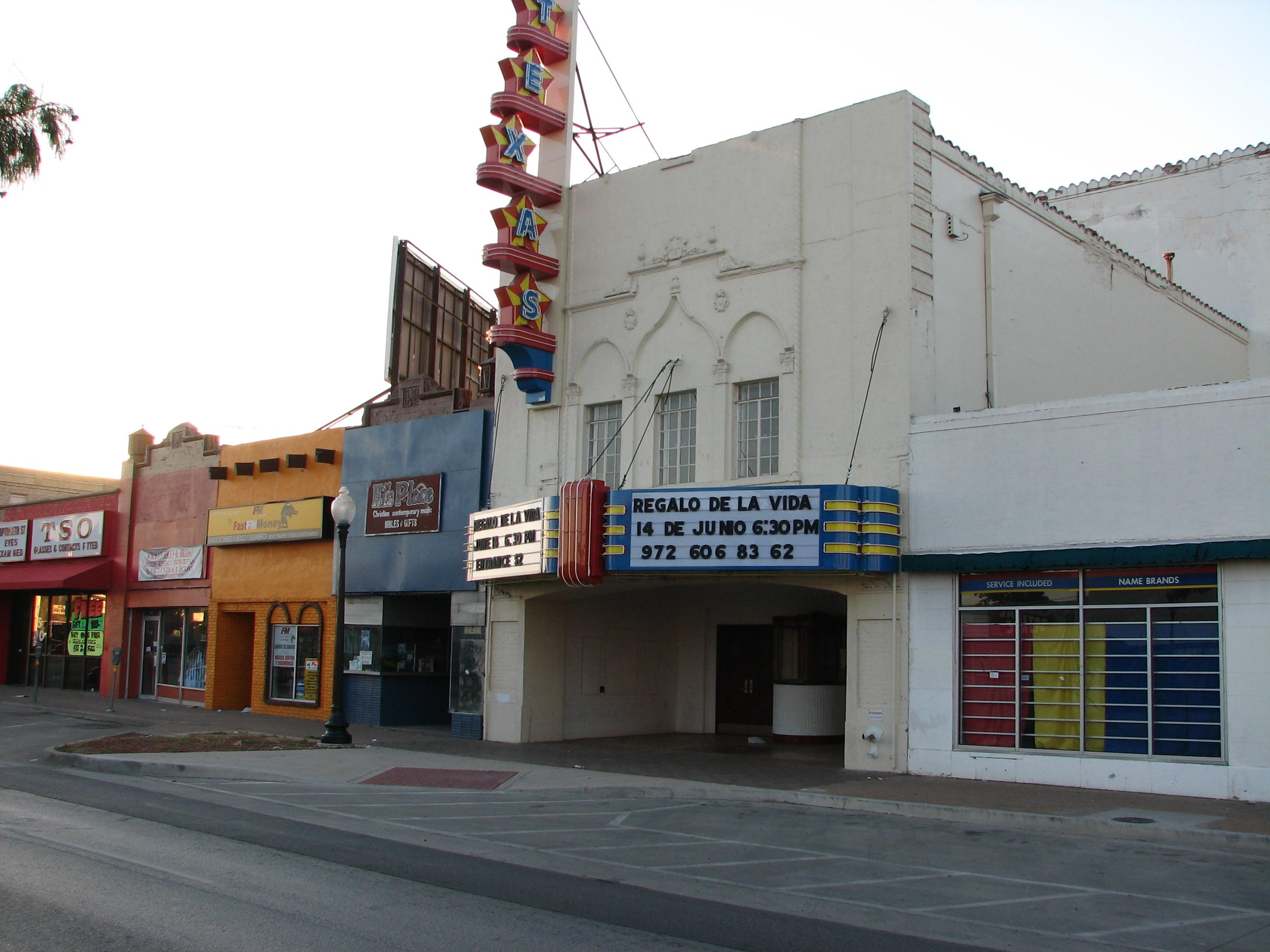
The Texas Theatre in Dallas, Texas, where Lee Harvey Oswald sneaked into and was later arrested after a short struggle.

1:35 p.m.: After killing Tippit, Oswald was seen traveling on foot toward the Texas Theatre on West Jefferson Boulevard. At about 1:35 p.m. Johnny Calvin Brewer, the manager of Hardy's Shoe Store, saw Oswald turning his face away from the street and ducking into the entranceway of Brewer's store as Dallas police cars approached with sirens audible. When Oswald left the store, Brewer followed him and watched him enter the Texas Theatre without paying while ticket attendant Julie Postal was distracted.. Governor Connolly undergoes surgery on a bullet wound on his chest.

1:38 p.m.: Anchorman Cronkite reports the official word that Kennedy is dead and Johnson will be sworn in as president.

1:40 p.m.: Johnson phones Attorney General Robert F. Kennedy to express his condolences and ask where he should take the oath of office of the president of the United States.

Johnny Brewer notifies Julie Postal that Oswald is in the theatre. Postal in turn informs the Dallas police at 1:40 p.m.

1:45 p.m.: 15 police officers surround the movie theater where Oswald is hiding.

1:50 p.m.: Johnson telephones his friend Irving Goldberg, an attorney. The two decide to ask Sarah T. Hughes to administer the oath.

When an arrest attempt is made on Oswald inside the theater, he resists arrest, punching and attempting to shoot a patrolman after yelling, "Well, it's all over now!"

1:51 p.m.: Police report Oswald in custody.

2:00 p.m.: Kennedy's body was removed from Parkland Hospital and driven to Air Force One at Love Field. The removal occurred after an angry confrontation between Kennedy's special assistant Ken O'Donnell backed by Kennedy's Secret Service agents and doctors including medical examiner Earl Rose, along with a justice of the peace. The removal of Kennedy's body may have been illegal according to Texas state law because it occurred before a forensic examination could be performed by the Dallas coroner.

Police’s paraffin tests confirm Oswald recently fired a gun.

2:10 p.m.: Abraham Zapruder arrives at WFAA-TV in Dallas and is interviewed about his film.

2:13 p.m.: Police find the weapon used to kill the president on the 6th floor of the Texas School Book depository.

2:15 p.m.:Kennedy's casket is loaded onto the Presidential plane..

2:30 p.m.: Interrogated for almost 12 hours, Oswald states he had nothing to do with the assassination. Shown photos of him holding a rifle Oswald "sneered, saying that they were fake photographs … [taken] by the police, that they had superimposed upon the photographs a rifle and revolver." He eventually stops answering all questions.

2:38 p.m.: Johnson is sworn in as president by federal judge Sarah Hughes on Air Force One.

2:47 p.m.: Air Force One departs Love Field for Washington, D.C.

3:20 p.m.: Governor Connolly is taken out our surgery..

5:58 p.m.: Air Force One lands at Air Force Base..

7:05 p.m.: Oswald was charged with "murder with malice" in the killing of police officer J.D. Tippit.

11:26 p.m.: Oswald was then charged with the murder of President Kennedy.

== Days following the assassination ==
All timestamps in Central Standard Time (CST) unless otherwise stated.

=== Saturday, November 23, 1963 ===
Military pallbearers carried the flag-draped coffin into the East Room of the White House, where he lay in repose for 24 hours. The new president, Lyndon B. Johnson, issued Presidential Proclamation 3561, declaring Monday to be a national day of mourning, and only essential emergency workers to be at their posts. He read the proclamation over a nationwide radio and television broadcast at 4:45 p.m. from the Fish Room (currently known as the Roosevelt Room) at the White House.

=== Sunday, November 24, 1963 ===
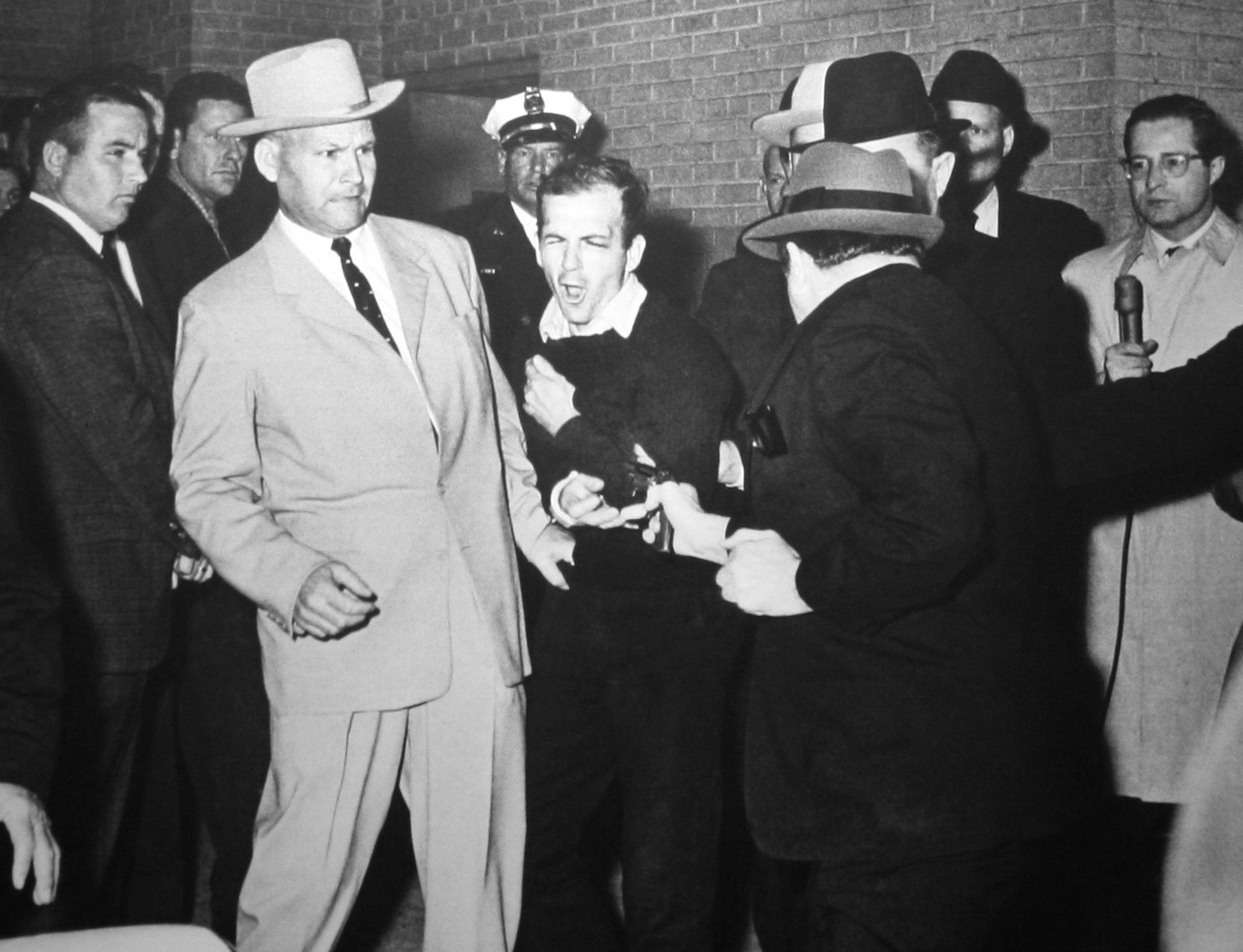
Jack Ruby fatally shoots Lee Harvey Oswald. Winner of the 1964 Pulitzer Prize for Photography.

At 11:21 a.m. before live television cameras, Oswald was shot and mortally wounded in the basement of Dallas Police headquarters by a local nightclub owner with alleged Mafia ties, Jack Ruby. Unconscious, Oswald was put into an ambulance and rushed to Parkland Memorial Hospital, the same hospital where doctors tried to save Kennedy two days earlier. Oswald died at 1:07 p.m, one hour and 46 minutes after being fatally shot.

Kennedy's coffin was carried on a horse-drawn caisson to the Capitol to lie in state. By Sunday evening, nearly 300,000 mourners, stretching over 9 miles long, came to view the guarded casket, with a quarter million passing through the rotunda during the 18 hours of lying in state.

=== Monday, November 25, 1963 ===
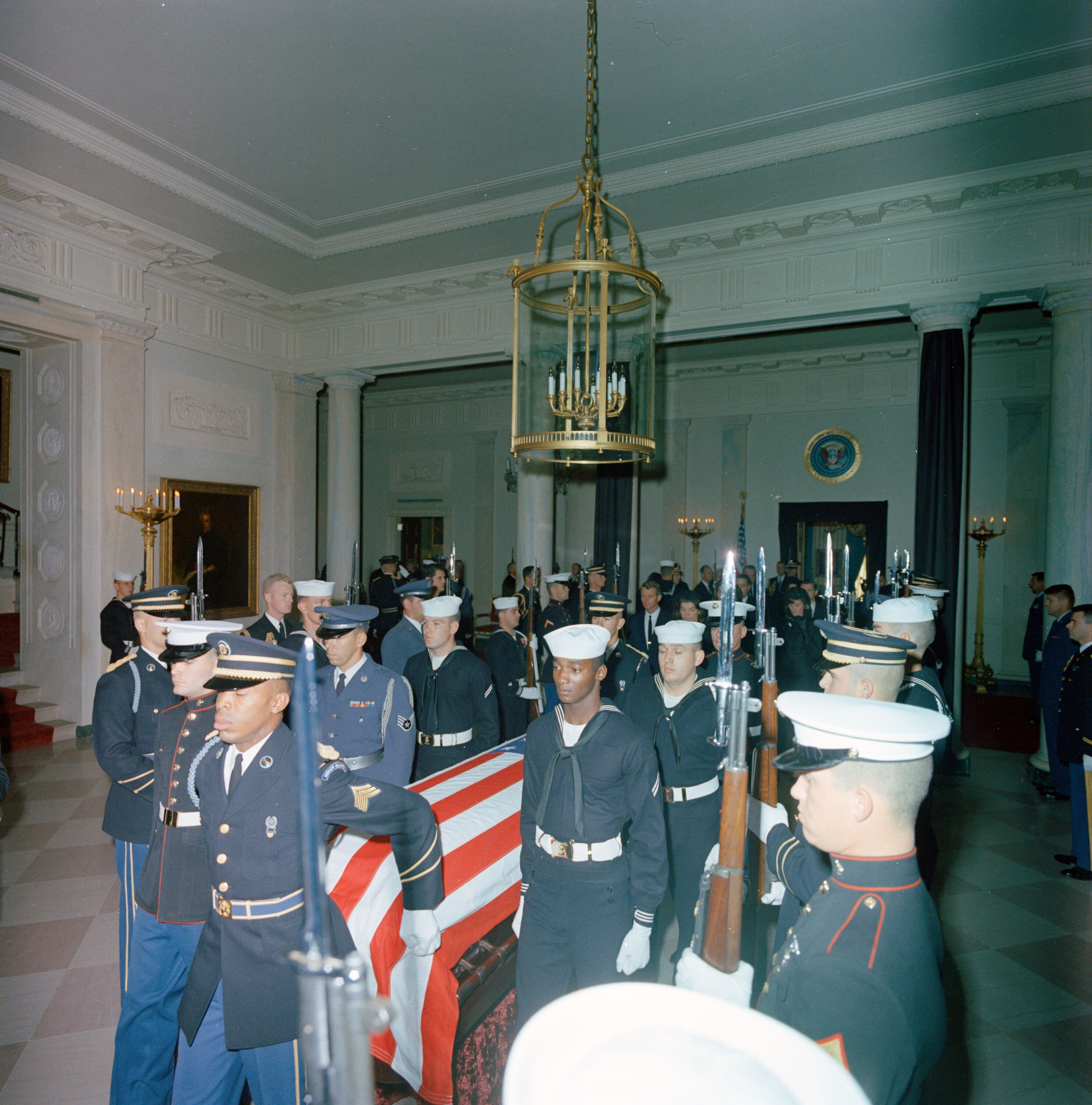
Honor pallbearers move the casket of President John F. Kennedy through the Entrance Hall of the White House. November 24, 1963.

At roughly 8:30 a.m., Kennedy's casket was moved from the Rotunda, and carried via horse-drawn carriage to St. Matthew's Cathedral, arriving at shortly past 10 a.m. The Requiem Mass was led by Cardinal Richard Cushing. About 1,200 guests, including representatives from over 90 countries, attended. After the service, Kennedy was buried at Arlington National Cemetery in Virginia. Burial rites were concluded by 1:15 p.m.

J.D Tippit's funeral is held the same day at roughly 2 p.m. in Dallas at the Beckley Hills Baptist Church, where more than 700 uniformed policemen and approximately 1,500 citizens attend. Additional members included Tippit's parents, Edgar Lee Tippit and Lizzie Mae Rush; his widow, Marie Tippit (née Gasway); his 3 children, Charles Allen, Brenda Kay, and Curtis Ray Tippit; and other friends and family. After the funeral, 15 men escort Tippit's casket to Laurel Land Memorial Park, where he is buried in the Memorial Court of Honor.

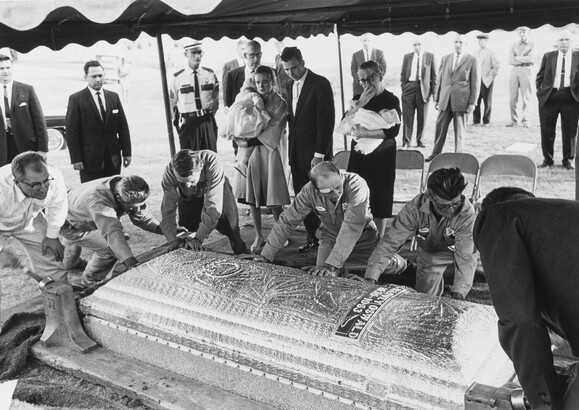
The family of Lee Harvey Oswald at his gravesite, as they watch his casket being buried underground. November 25, 1963.

Finally, Oswald’s funeral is held at roughly 4 p.m., at Shannon Rose Hill Funeral Chapel in eastern Fort Worth, Texas. Excluding the Oswald family, little to no one showed up to the funeral. The funeral was directed by Paul J. Groody, and 7 newspaper reporters acted as pallbearers, 2 of which remain unknown. Those in attendance included Oswald's widow, Marina Oswald; his brother, Robert Oswald; his mother, Marguerite Oswald; and his 2 daughters, Rachel and June Lee Oswald. Additionally, about 75 reporters were ordered to step away from the gravesite, and law enforcement was present. Oswald's body was then lowered into his grave at 4:28 p.m, and his grave was covered by sunset.

== Investigations and other developments ==
=== Events during the 1960s (1964–1969) ===
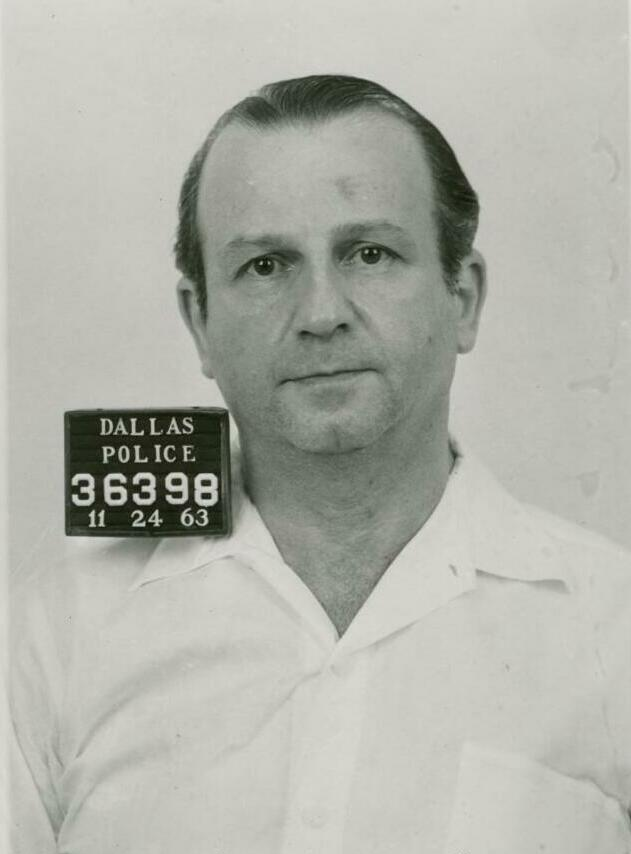
Mugshot of Jack Ruby taken November 24, 1963, after his arrest for fatally shooting and killing Lee Harvey Oswald.

March 14, 1964: Ruby is convicted of murder with malice and sentenced to death.

September 24, 1964: The Warren Commission's 888-page final report was presented to President Johnson and made public three days later, saying one shot wounded President Kennedy and Governor Connally, and a subsequent shot hit Kennedy in the head, killing him. The Commission concluded a third shot was fired, but made no conclusion as to whether it was the first, second or third shot fired. The Commission concluded Oswald fired all three shots.

October 5, 1966: Appellate court ruled Ruby's motion for a change of venue before the original trial court should have been granted. Ruby's conviction and death sentence are overturned. Arrangements were underway for a new trial to be held in February 1967.

January 3, 1967: Jack Ruby dies in prison from cancer.

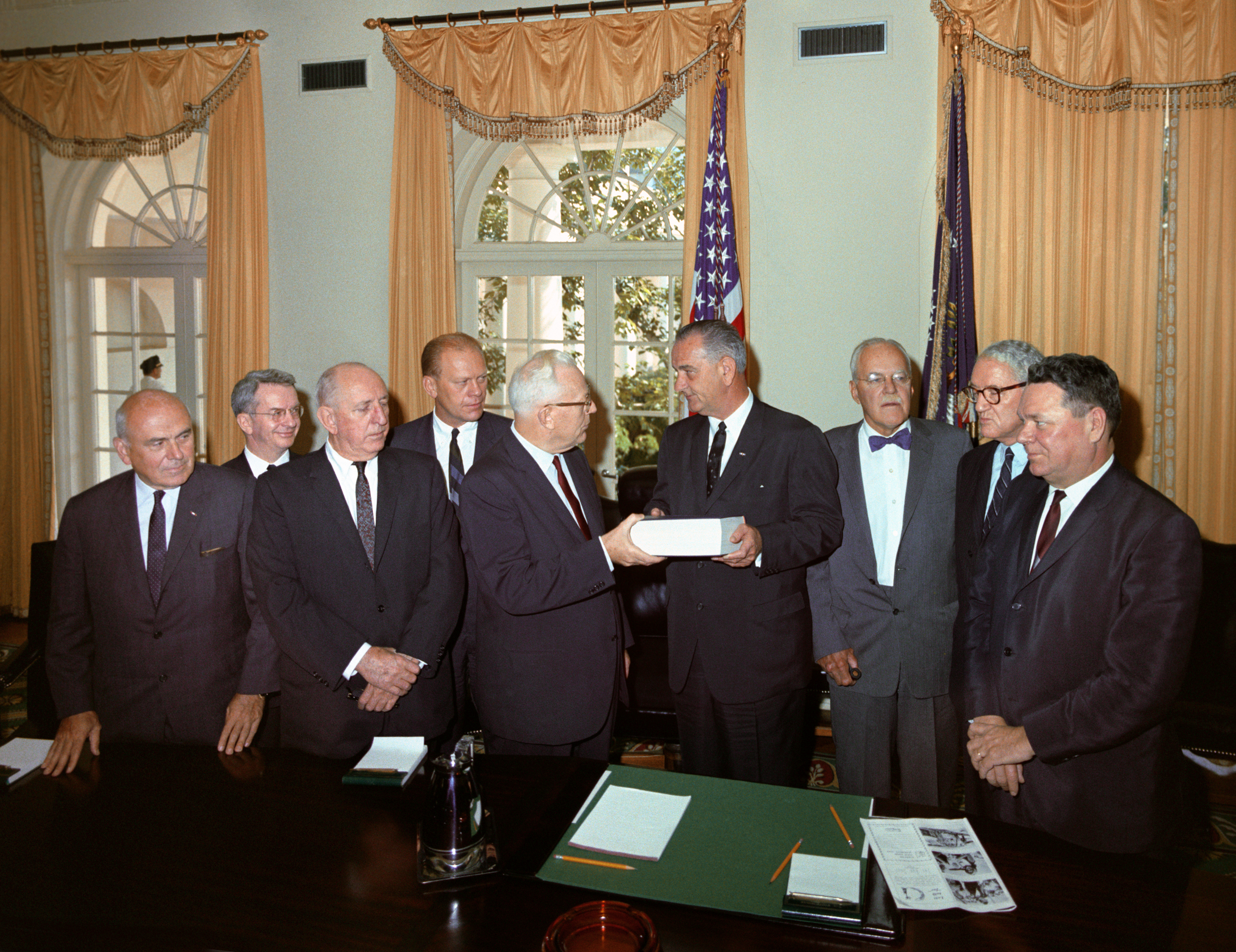
The Warren Commission presents its report to President Johnson. From left to right: John McCloy, J. Lee Rankin (General Counsel), Senator Richard Russell, Congressman Gerald Ford, Chief Justice Earl Warren, President Lyndon B. Johnson, Allen Dulles, Senator John Sherman Cooper, and Congressman Hale Boggs.

March 1, 1967: New Orleans District Attorney Jim Garrison charged New Orleans businessman Clay Shaw with conspiring to assassinate President Kennedy, with the help of Oswald, David Ferrie, and others.

January 29, 1969: Clay Shaw was brought to trial in Orleans Parish Criminal Court.

March 1, 1969: A jury took less than an hour to find Clay Shaw not guilty. It remains the only trial to be brought for the assassination of President Kennedy.

=== Events after the 1960s (1975–2025) ===
March 6, 1975: Assassination researchers Robert Groden and Dick Gregory present the first-ever US network television showing of the Zapruder film on the ABC late-night television show Good Night America (hosted by Geraldo Rivera).

March 29, 1979: The House Select Committee on Assassinations investigated the assassination and based on incorrect acoustic evidence states Kennedy was "probably assassinated as a result of a conspiracy". The Committee states the American mobsters Carlos Marcello and Santo Trafficante Jr. had the means, motive, and opportunity to assassinate Kennedy."

1982: Panel of 12 scientists appointed by the National Academy of Sciences, unanimously concluded HSCA's acoustic evidence was "seriously flawed". They concluded the recording was made after the President had already been shot and it did not indicate any additional gunshots. Their conclusions were published in the journal Science.

December 20, 1991: Release of the film JFK.

October 26, 1992: President George H. W. Bush signs the President John F. Kennedy Assassination Records Collection Act of 1992, establishing the Assassination Records Review Board.

September 30, 1998: Assassination Records Review Board submits its final report.

July 24, 2017: National Archives and Records Administration (NARA) began to release remaining documents related to the assassination previously withheld.

December 15, 2022: NARA releases an additional 13,173 documents as ordered by President Joe Biden.

September 9, 2023: Paul E. Landis, an 88-year-old former Secret Service agent who witnessed the assassination at close range, says he took a bullet from the car after Kennedy was shot, and left it on the president's stretcher at the hospital.

January 23, 2025: During his second term President Donald Trump signs an executive order to declassify records about the assassinations of John F. Kennedy, his brother Robert F. Kennedy, and Martin Luther King Jr.

== Bibliography ==
- The Torch Is Passed. New York: Associated Press. 1963.
- Johnson, Lyndon (1971). The Vantage Point: Perspectives of the Presidency, 1963–1969. New York: Holt, Rinehart, and Winston. ISBN 0-03-084492-4.
- Miller, Merle (1980). Lyndon: An Oral Biography. New York: Putnam. ISBN 0-399-12357-1.
- NBC News (1966). There Was a President. New York: Random House.
- The New York Times (2003). Semple, Robert B. Jr. (ed.). Four days in November. New York: St. Martin's Press.
- United Press International; American Heritage Magazine (1964). Four Days. New York: American Heritage Pub. Co.
- Warren Commission (1964). Report of the President's Commission on the Assassination of President John F. Kennedy. Washington, D.C.: United States Government Printing Office – via National Archives.
- White, Theodore H. (1965). The Making of the President 1964. New York: Athenium Publishers.
