= LCHS =

LCHS may refer to:

- Lady Commander of the Order of the Holy Sepulchre, a Catholic chivalric order
- Little Compton Historical Society, a non-profit organization in Little Compton, Rhode Island, United States

== Secondary schools ==
Canada

- Laval Catholic High School (renamed Laurier Senior High School) - Laval, Quebec (Montreal area)
- Luther College High School – Regina, Saskatchewan

United Kingdom

- England
  - Lincoln Christ's Hospital School - Lincoln, Lincolnshire
  - Lincolnshire Community Health Services
  - London Central High School, a component of London Central Elementary High School, a United States Department of Defense Dependents School (DoDDS) school

United States

- Alabama
  - Lauderdale County High School - Rogersville
- California
  - La Cañada High School
  - Laguna Creek High School
- Florida
  - Liberty County High School
- Georgia
  - Lanier County High School
- Idaho
  - Lake City High School
- Illinois
  - Lakes Community High School
  - Limestone Community High School
  - Lincoln Community High School
- Indiana
  - Lake Central High School
  - Lawrence Central High School
- Kentucky
  - Lee County High School
  - Lexington Catholic High School
- Massachusetts
  - Lynn Classical High School
- Michigan
  - Lansing Catholic High School
- Mississippi
  - Leflore County High School
- New Mexico
  - Las Cruces High School
- Pennsylvania
  - Lancaster Catholic High School
  - Lansdale Catholic High School
- Texas
  - Lakeview Centennial High School
  - Lamar Consolidated High School
- Virginia
  - Louisa County High School
- Washington State
  - Lynden Christian High School
