= Luta Mae McGrath =

World War II Veteran and United States Army Ordnance Corps Officer

Luta Mae Cornelius McGrath
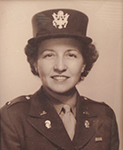
- Nickname: The First Lady of Ordnance
- Born: November 21, 1907; Beattyville, Kentucky
- Died: April 14, 2016 (aged 108) Annandale, Virginia
- Buried: Arlington National Cemetery
- Allegiance: United States
- Branch: United States Army
- Service years: 1943–1961
- Rank: Lieutenant Colonel
- Conflicts: World War II
- Spouses: LTC (Ret) Thomas J. McGrath, U.S. Army

Luta Mae (Cornelius) McGrath (November 21, 1907 – April 14, 2016) was an officer in the United States Army Ordnance Corps and the oldest surviving female veteran of World War II at the time of her death. In the Army Ordnance community, McGrath became known as "The First Lady of Ordnance" and was the first woman to be inducted into the Ordnance Corps Hall of Fame in 1985.

== Career ==
McGrath joined the Women's Army Auxiliary Corps as a private in 1943.
