= Lee County School District (Kentucky) =

School district in Kentucky, USA

Address
- 242 Lee Avenue Beattyville, Kentucky, 41311; United States

District information
- Type: Public
- Grades: PreK–12
- NCES District ID: 2103270

Students and staff
- Students: 895
- Teachers: 53.95
- Staff: 79.0
- Student–teacher ratio: 16.59

Other information
- Website: www.lee.k12.ky.us

Lee County School District (LCSD) is a school district headquartered in Beattyville, Kentucky. It serves residents in Lee County.

As of 2017 the district has about 1,100 students.

== History ==
By 2016 the school district enrollment declined due to the county losing population; this stemmed from area job losses.

== Schools and facilities ==
Schools:

- Lee County High School (Beattyville)
- Lee County Middle School (Beattyville)
- Lee County Elementary School (Unincorporated area)

Facilities:

- Lee County Area Technology Center (Beattyville)
  - Students in Lee, Owsley, and Wolfe counties use this center.

Former schools:

- Beattyville Elementary School (Beattyville) - Later moved outside the city limits
- Southside Elementary School (Unincorporated area)

== Demographics ==
As of 2017 over 75% of the students are on free or reduced lunch.
