= Malcolm Kilduff =

American journalist (1927–2003)

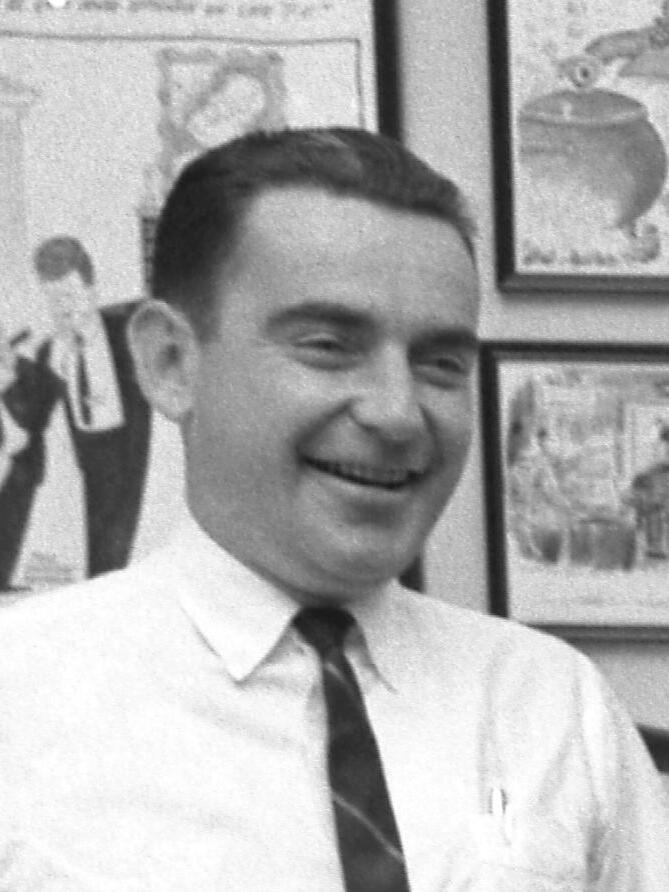
- Kilduff in February 1963
- Born: Malcolm MacGregor Kilduff Jr. September 26, 1927; Staten Island, New York City, U.S.
- Died: March 3, 2003 (aged 75); Beattyville, Kentucky, U.S.
- Resting place: Arlington National Cemetery
- Occupation: Journalist
- Known for: Announcing death of John F. Kennedy

Malcolm MacGregor "Mac" Kilduff Jr. (September 26, 1927 – March 3, 2003) was an American journalist, best known for making the public announcement of the death of U.S. President John F. Kennedy.

Mac Kilduff was Kennedy's assistant White House Press Secretary, and the ranking press secretary on Kennedy's November 1963 trip to Dallas, Texas where Kennedy was assassinated.

== Biography ==
Kilduff was born in Staten Island, New York City. He grew up in Arlington, Virginia, and went to Washington-Lee High School. He served in the United States Navy from 1945 to 1947. He went to George Washington University and Harvard University. Kilduff also went to the Arlington Institute of Law.

== November 22, 1963 ==
President John F. Kennedy made a trip to Texas in November 1963, accompanied by his wife Jacqueline Kennedy, Vice President Lyndon B. Johnson, Johnson's wife Lady Bird Johnson, and others. Kilduff was acting press secretary for the trip because the main White House press secretary, Pierre Salinger, was traveling to Japan with six members of the Cabinet, including Secretary of State Dean Rusk, for a joint meeting with the Japanese Cabinet.

President Kennedy was shot at about 12:30 p.m. CST on November 22, 1963, while riding in a motorcade through Dealey Plaza. He was rushed to Dallas's Parkland Memorial Hospital. The doctors at Parkland pronounced the president dead at about 1 pm CST.

=== Announcing death of JFK ===
It fell to Kilduff to bring the news from Kennedy's trauma room to Vice President Johnson waiting in another room in the hospital. Kilduff simply walked up to Johnson and addressed him as "Mr. President." Lady Bird Johnson let out a short scream as the news hit.

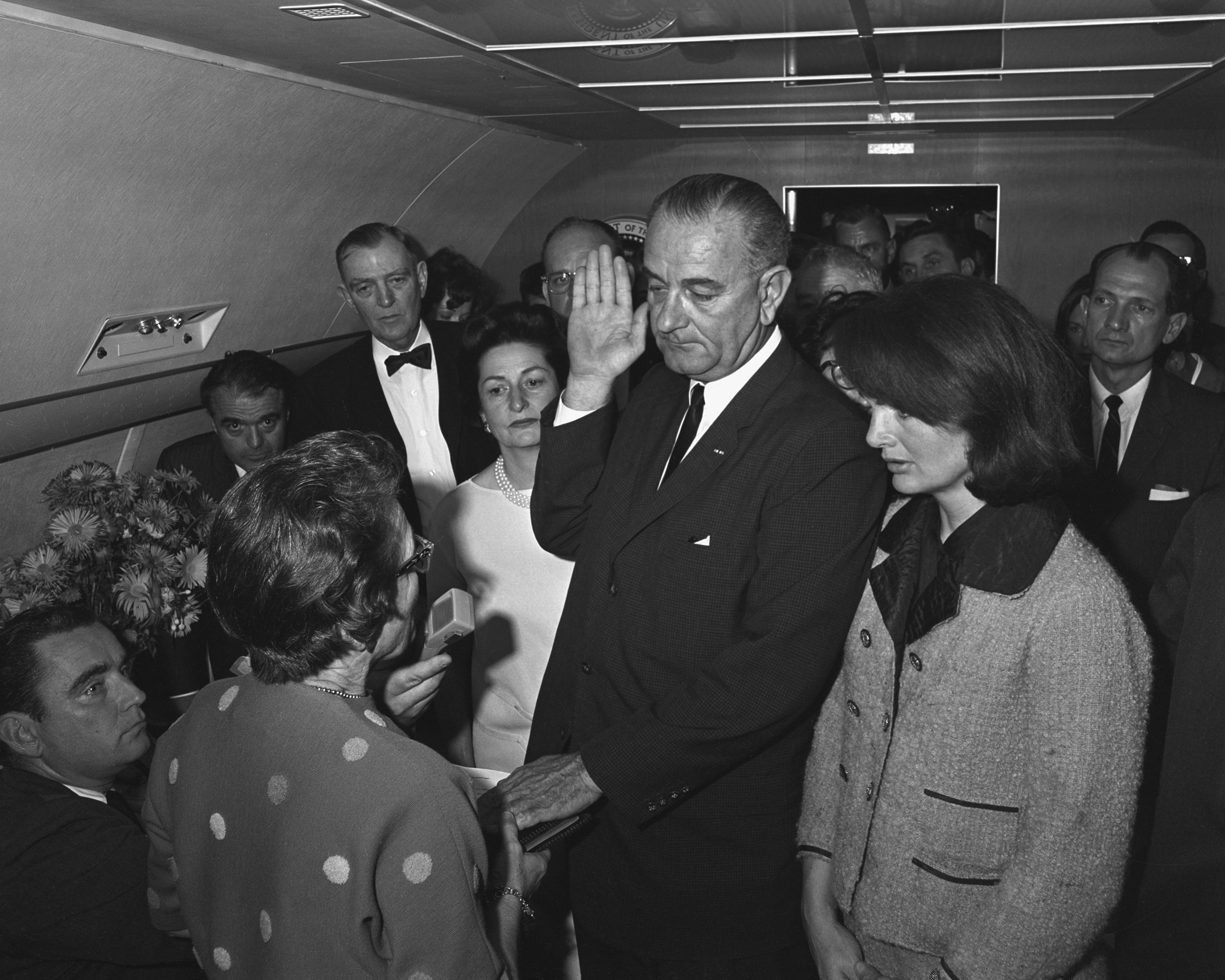
Kilduff (far bottom-left) holds a dictaphone up to President Lyndon B. Johnson as he takes the oath of office of the presidency following the death of John F. Kennedy.

Kilduff asked for Johnson's approval to announce Kennedy's death to the public. Johnson ordered that the announcement of the president's death be made only after he left the hospital. Johnson told him:

I think I had better get out of here ... before you announce it. We don't know whether this is a worldwide conspiracy, whether they are after me as well as they were after President Kennedy, or whether they are after Speaker (John W.) McCormack, or Senator (Carl) Hayden. We just don't know.

Johnson left the hospital and was driven back to Air Force One at Dallas Love Field. He later recounted to Merle Miller: "I asked that the announcement be made after we had left the room...so that if it were an international conspiracy and they were out to destroy our form of government and the leaders in that government, that we would minimize the opportunity for doing so."

After Kilduff received confirmation that Johnson was back at Air Force One, Kilduff announced President Kennedy's death to the press assembled in a nurse's classroom at Parkland Hospital, at 1:33 p.m. CST (19:33 UTC), saying:

President John F. Kennedy died at approximately 1:00 Central Standard Time today here in Dallas. He died of a gunshot wound to the brain. I have no other details regarding the assassination of the president.

Kilduff then followed Johnson back to Air Force One. While Johnson took the oath of office of the president of the United States, Kilduff made the only audio recording of the event, by holding up a Dictabelt Dictaphone which had been on the president's desk, the only audio recording device Kilduff could locate aboard the plane.

== Later career ==
Kilduff continued to serve as Assistant Press Secretary for the Johnson administration until 1965, when he resigned to start a public relations agency.

He later worked as an editor for The Beattyville Enterprise newspaper in Beattyville, Kentucky. After his divorce from his first wife, Bonnie, Kilduff had met and married a Beattyville native, Rosemary Porter Kilduff, who had worked in Washington, D.C. as an aide to U.S. Sen. Vance Hartke. Upon her retirement from government service, the Kilduffs moved back to her childhood home in Beattyville, on a hill overlooking the town's east side and the nursing home where he eventually died. While editor of The Beattyville Enterprise, Kilduff won a number of Kentucky Press Association awards. Rosemary was also a columnist for the paper and was also an award-winning journalist. One of her columns, dealing with methods of forecasting the weather in mountain folklore, became the impetus for the town's annual fall festival, the Woolly Worm Festival, held the third weekend in October.

In Beattyville, Kilduff was active in the Kiwanis Club, the Natural Bridge Park Association, and the Buckhorn Scenic Trails Association. He was also an admitted recovering alcoholic and often spoke to students and civic groups not only about his experience with President Kennedy but of his experiences with alcoholism and his recovery.

Rosemary Kilduff preceded her husband in death and is buried in the Proctor Cemetery in Lee County, Kentucky, across the Kentucky River from Beattyville.

Kilduff died in retirement at a nursing home in Beattyville at age 75 in March 2003 . He is buried in Arlington National Cemetery in Arlington, Virginia.
