= First inauguration of Lyndon B. Johnson =

8th United States intra-term presidential inauguration

Coordinates: 32°50′42.22″N 96°50′49.86″W

First presidential inauguration of Lyndon B. Johnson
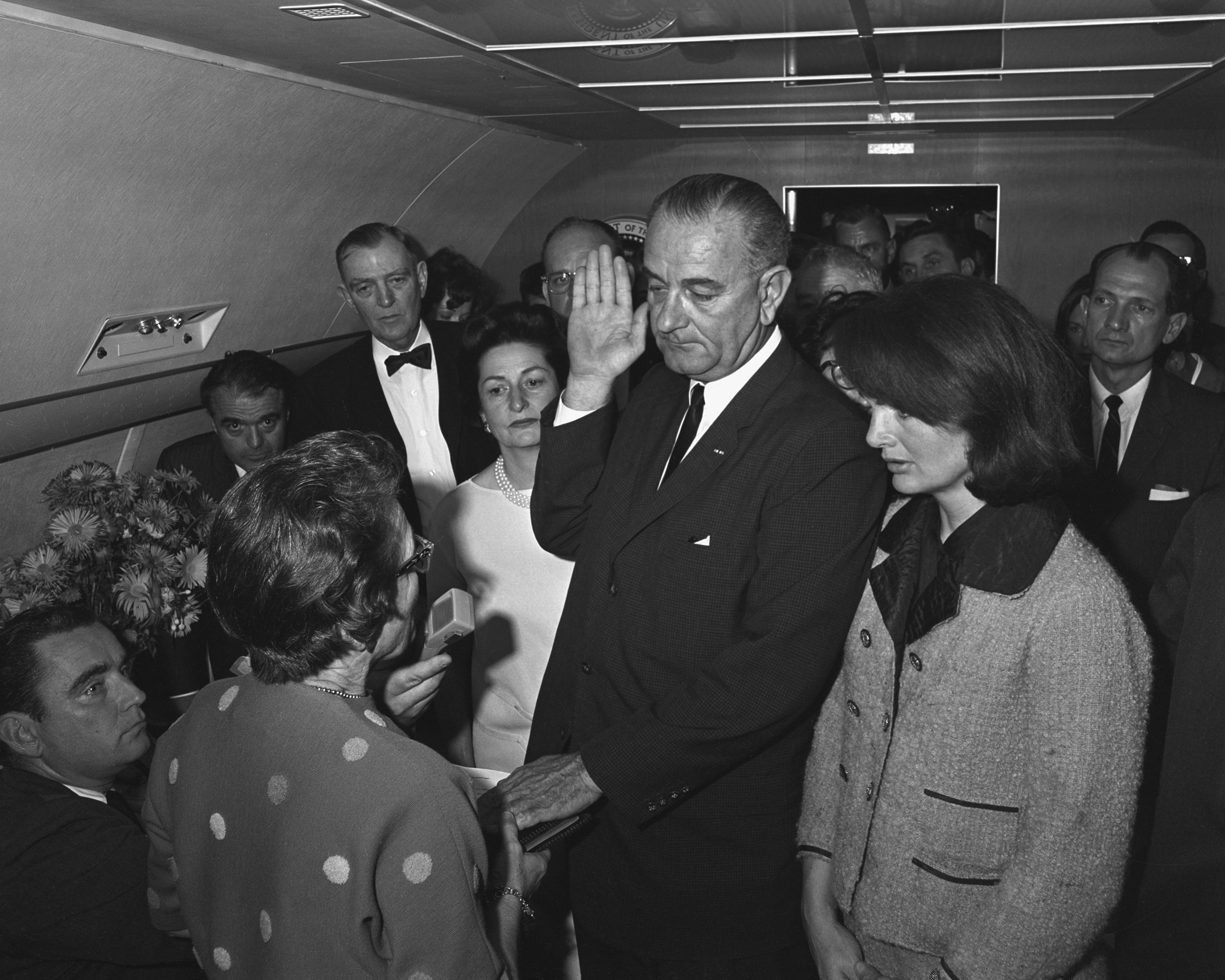
- Lyndon B. Johnson taking the oath of office on Air Force One following the assassination of John F. Kennedy, Dallas, Texas
- Date: November 22, 1963; 62 years ago
- Location: Air Force One, Love Field, Dallas, Texas
- Participants: Lyndon B. Johnson; 36th president of the United States — Assuming office Sarah Tilghman Hughes; Judge of the United States District Court for the Northern District of Texas — Administering oath

The first inauguration of Lyndon B. Johnson as the 36th president of the United States was held on Friday, November 22, 1963, aboard Air Force One (specifically VC-137C SAM 26000) at Dallas Love Field, following the assassination of President John F. Kennedy earlier that day. The inauguration – the eighth non-scheduled inauguration to ever take place – marked the commencement of the first term (a partial term of 425 days) of Lyndon B. Johnson as president.

== Assassination of John F. Kennedy ==
At 12:30 p.m. Central Standard Time on November 22, Kennedy was shot in Dallas while riding with his wife, Jacqueline, in the presidential motorcade. Vice President Johnson was riding in a car behind the president with his wife, Lady Bird Johnson, and Texas Senator Ralph Yarborough. Immediately after shots were fired, Johnson was thrown down and sat on by Secret Service agent Rufus Youngblood, and the President's and Vice President's cars sped to Parkland Memorial Hospital.

There were initial reports that Johnson might have also been shot, slightly wounded in the arm or that he had suffered another heart attack (he had suffered one eight years earlier that nearly killed him). Mrs. Johnson confirmed to reporters that he was fine and did not suffer any injury or illness other than being shaken at what he had seen.

In the hospital, Johnson was surrounded by Secret Service agents, who encouraged him to return to Washington in case he too was targeted for assassination. Johnson asked to wait until he knew of Kennedy's condition; at 1:20 p.m., he was told Kennedy was dead and left the hospital almost 20 minutes later.

== Dallas Love Field ==
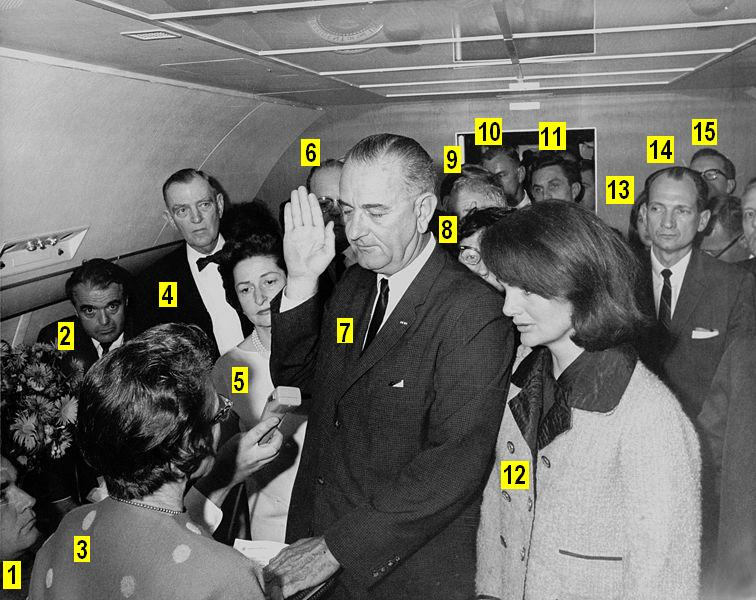
Lyndon B. Johnson taking the oath of office on Air Force One following the assassination of John F. Kennedy, Dallas, Texas. Identified persons include: (#1) Malcolm Kilduff (press secretary), (#2) Jack Valenti (media adviser), (#3) Judge Sarah T. Hughes, (#4) Congressman Albert Thomas, (#5) Lady Bird Johnson, (#6) Chief Jesse Curry (Dallas police chief), (#7) Lyndon B. Johnson, (#8) Evelyn Lincoln (personal secretary to John F. Kennedy), (#9) Congressman Homer Thornberry, (#10) Roy Kellerman (USSS agent), (#11) Lem Johns (USSS agent), (#12) Jacqueline Kennedy, (#13) Pamela Turnure (press secretary to Jacqueline Kennedy), (#14) Congressman Jack Brooks, (#15) Bill Moyers (Peace Corps deputy director). Photo by Cecil W. Stoughton.

At this point arrangements were made to provide Secret Service protection of the two Johnson daughters (Lynda Bird Johnson Robb and Luci Baines Johnson), and it was decided that the new president would leave on the presidential aircraft because it had better communications equipment. Johnson was driven by an unmarked police car to Dallas Love Field, and kept below the car's window level throughout the journey.

The president waited for Jacqueline Kennedy, who in turn would not leave Dallas without her husband's body, to arrive aboard Air Force One. Kennedy's casket was finally brought to the aircraft, but takeoff was delayed until Johnson took the oath of office.

There was concern that since the Secret Service had taken the body of Kennedy from Parkland Hospital against the wishes of the Dallas medical examiner, Earl Rose, who had insisted an autopsy was required, the Dallas Police Department would seek to prevent Air Force One taking off.

President Johnson chose federal district Judge Sarah T. Hughes, a long-standing friend, to swear him in.

=== Inauguration aboard Air Force One ===
For the inauguration twenty-seven people squeezed into the 12-by-15-foot stateroom of Air Force One for the proceedings. Adding to the discomfort was the lack of air conditioning as the aircraft had been disconnected from the external power supply, in order to take off promptly. As the inauguration proceeded the four jet engines of Air Force One were being powered up.

The Warren Commission's report detailed the inauguration:

From the Presidential airplane, the new President telephoned Attorney General Robert F. Kennedy, who advised that Mr. Johnson take the Presidential oath of office before the plane left Dallas. Federal Judge Sarah T. Hughes hastened to the plane to administer the oath. Members of the Presidential and Vice-Presidential parties filled the central compartment of the plane to witness the swearing in. At 2:38 p.m. CST, Lyndon Baines Johnson took the oath of office as the 36th President of the United States. Mrs. Kennedy and Mrs. Johnson stood at the side of the new President as he took the oath of office. Nine minutes later, the Presidential airplane departed for Washington, D.C.

The swearing-in ceremony administered by Judge Hughes in an Air Force One conference room represented the first time that a woman administered the presidential oath of office as well as the only time it was conducted on an airplane. Normally, the Chief Justice of the United States swears the president in. In this case, it would be Earl Warren. Instead of the usual Bible, Johnson was sworn in upon a missal found on a side table in Kennedy's Air Force One bedroom which was mistaken for a Bible (Johnson was not Catholic). After the oath had been taken, Johnson kissed his wife on the forehead. Mrs. Johnson then took Jackie Kennedy's hand and told her, "The whole nation mourns your husband."

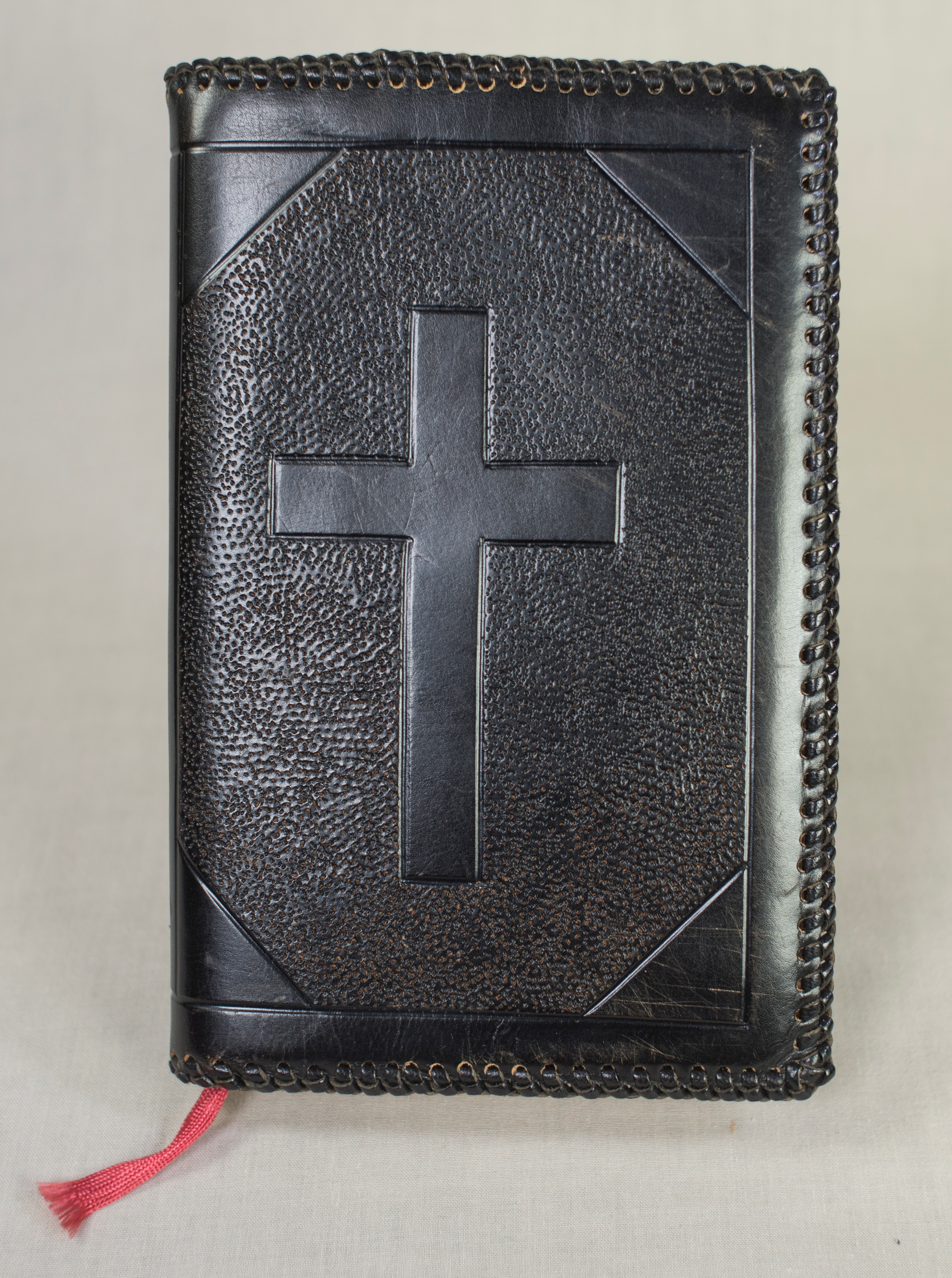
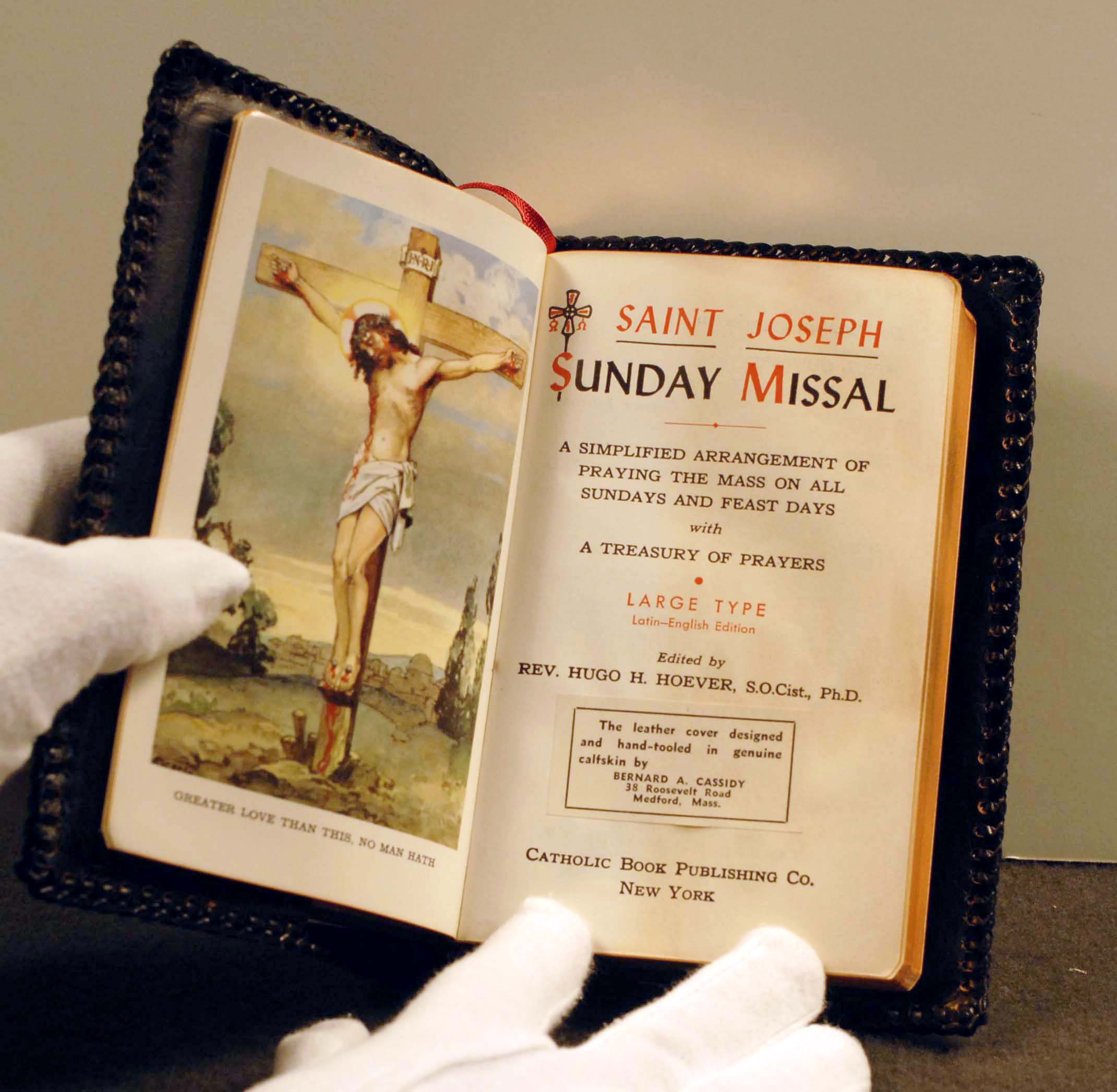
Missal used in the inauguration

The famous photograph of the inauguration was taken by Cecil Stoughton, John F. Kennedy's official photographer. On Stoughton's suggestion Johnson was flanked by his wife and Jacqueline Kennedy, facing slightly away from the camera so that blood stains on her pink Chanel suit would not be visible. The photograph was taken using a Hasselblad camera. The inauguration was sound recorded on Air Force One's Cockpit voice recorder by White House Press Secretary Malcolm Kilduff using the plane's Dictaphone.

== Aftermath ==
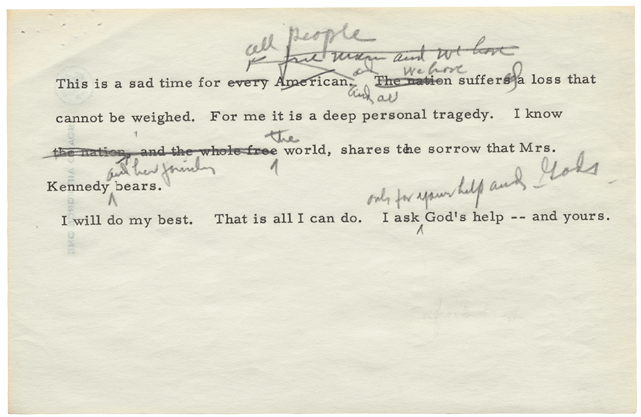
Hand-marked statement

During the flight back to Andrews Air Force Base, Johnson made several phone calls on the radio telephone, including to Rose Kennedy (JFK's mother) and Nellie Connally (wife of John Connally). In addition, he made the decision to request all cabinet members to stay in their posts and asked to meet both parties' leaders in Congress soon.

Johnson also asked Jack Valenti, Bill Moyers, and Liz Carpenter to write a brief statement for him to read on the day's events, which he then edited slightly himself. At 6:10 pm, after landing at Andrews amid a crowd of congressional leaders, he walked to an already prepared set of microphones and began his first public statement as president:

This is a sad time for all people. We have suffered a loss that cannot be weighed. For me, it is a deep personal tragedy. I know that the world shares the sorrow that Mrs. Kennedy and her family bear. I will do my best. That is all I can do. I ask for your help—and God's.

Johnson had to raise his voice to be heard at the Air Force base, and afterward regretted delivering the remarks, believing he sounded harsh and strident.

In 2015, a bronze plaque was placed at the inauguration location on the aircraft ramp at Love Field. Donated by historian Farris Rookstool III, a duplicate of it was also placed in the terminal, near a window overlooking the location where Air Force One was parked. A light which can be seen from the window indicates the exact location of the plaque.

== See also ==
- Presidency of Lyndon B. Johnson
- Let Us Continue
- Second inauguration of Lyndon B. Johnson – 45th United States presidential inauguration
