= Lee County High School (Kentucky) =

High school in Lee County, Kentucky, United States

Coordinates: 37.5816°N 83.7084°W

Lee County Middle High School

Location
- 599 Lee Avenue; Beattyville, (Lee County), Kentucky 41311; United States

Information
- Type: Public high school
- School district: Lee County Schools
- Principal: William Noble
- Teaching staff: 26.00 (FTE)
- Enrollment: 448 (2023-2024)
- Student to teacher ratio: 17.23
- Colors: Blue, white and scarlet
- Nickname: Bobcats
- Website: https://www.lee.kyschools.us/o/lc-middle-high

Lee County Middle High School (LCHS) is a senior high school in Beattyville, Kentucky. It is a part of Lee County School District.
