= Beattyville, Kentucky =

- City
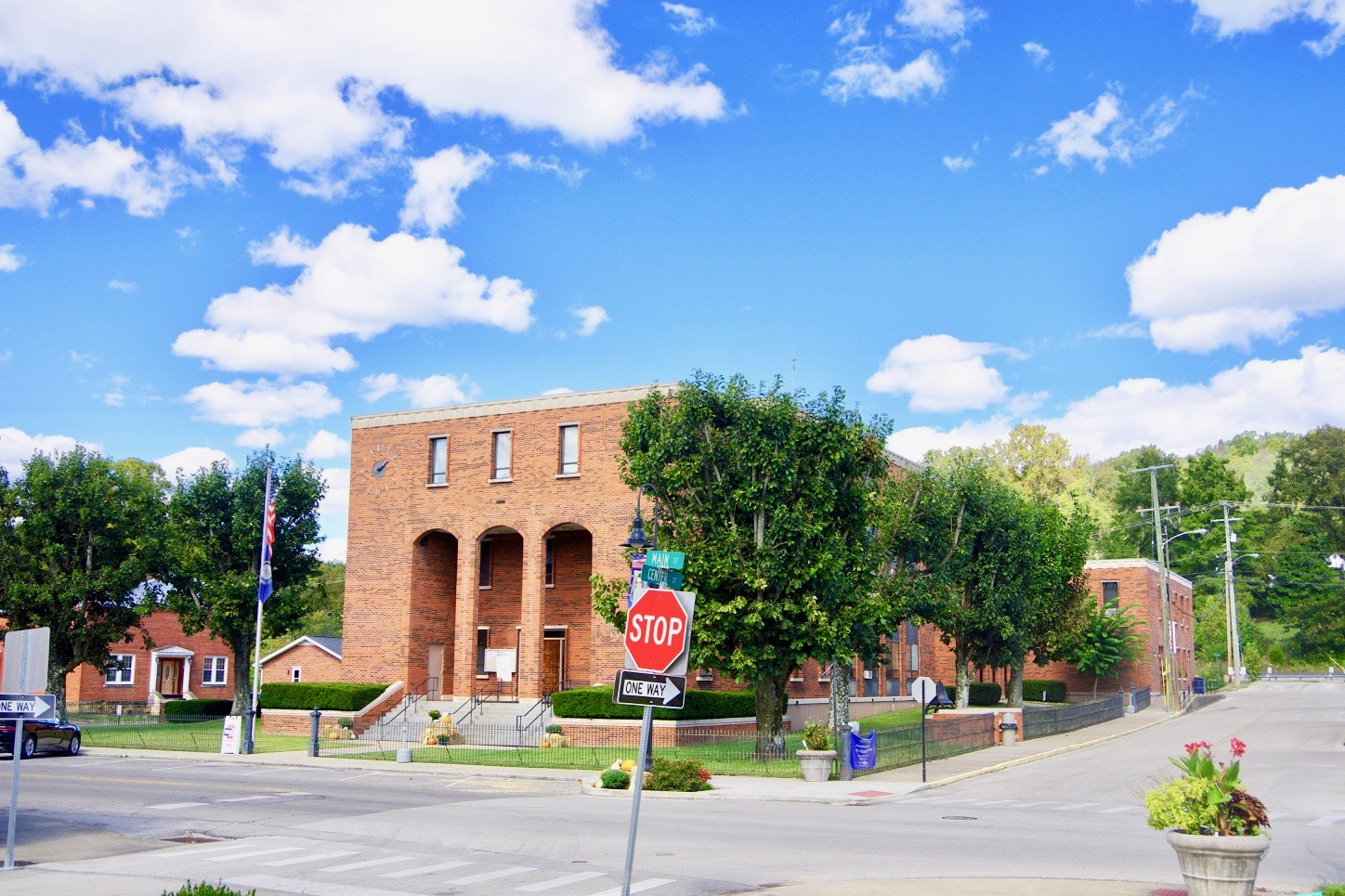
- Lee County Courthouse in Beattyville

- Location in Lee County, Kentucky
- Coordinates: 37°34′17″N 83°42′24″W
- Country: United States
- State: Kentucky
- County: Lee

Area
  - Total: 2.31 sq mi (5.97 km^{2})
  - Land: 2.29 sq mi (5.94 km^{2})
  - Water: 0.0077 sq mi (0.02 km^{2})
- Elevation: 669 ft (204 m)

Population (2020)
  - Total: 2,176
  - Estimate (2022): 2,146 ▼
  - Density: 949/sq mi (366/km^{2})
- Time zone: UTC-5 (Eastern (EST))
  - Summer (DST): UTC-4 (EDT)
- ZIP code: 41311
- Area code: 606
- FIPS code: 21-04546
- GNIS feature ID: 0510486
- Website: www.beattyville.org

Beattyville is a home rule class city in, and the county seat of, Lee County, Kentucky, United States. The city was formally established by the state assembly as "Beatty" in 1851 and incorporated in 1872. It was named for Samuel Beatty, a pioneer settler. As of the 2020 census, Beattyville had a population of 2,176.

== Geography ==
Beattyville is in central Lee County at the confluence of the North and South Forks of the Kentucky River, a tributary of the Ohio River in central Appalachia.

Kentucky Route 11 passes through the city, crossing the North and South Forks of the Kentucky on separate bridges. The highway leads north 30 miles (48 km) to Stanton and south 45 miles (72 km) to Manchester. Kentucky Route 52 joins KY 11 to cross the North Fork of the Kentucky River but leads northwest 22 miles (35 km) to Irvine and east 24 miles (39 km) to Jackson.

According to the United States Census Bureau, the city has a total area of 2.3 square miles (6.0 km^{2}), of which 0.01 square miles (0.02 km^{2}), or 0.41%, are water.

=== Climate ===
The climate in this area is characterized by hot, humid summers and generally mild to cool winters. According to the Köppen Climate Classification system, Beattyville has a humid subtropical climate, abbreviated "Cfa" on climate maps.

== Demographics ==
Historical population
Census	Pop.	Note	%±
1870	123		—
1880	146		18.7%
1900	696		—
1910	1,360		95.4%
1920	1,210		−11.0%
1930	906		−25.1%
1940	1,012		11.7%
1950	1,042		3.0%
1960	1,048		0.6%
1970	923		−11.9%
1980	1,068		15.7%
1990	1,131		5.9%
2000	1,193		5.5%
2010	1,307		9.6%
2020	2,176		66.5%
2022 (est.)	2,146		−1.4%
U.S. Decennial Census

=== 2020 census ===
As of the 2020 census, Beattyville had a population of 2,176. The median age was 38.0 years. 12.5% of residents were under the age of 18 and 13.7% of residents were 65 years of age or older. For every 100 females there were 217.2 males, and for every 100 females age 18 and over there were 241.2 males age 18 and over.

0.0% of residents lived in urban areas, while 100.0% lived in rural areas.

There were 499 households in Beattyville, of which 28.3% had children under the age of 18 living in them. Of all households, 28.1% were married-couple households, 19.6% were households with a male householder and no spouse or partner present, and 46.3% were households with a female householder and no spouse or partner present. About 43.7% of all households were made up of individuals and 19.2% had someone living alone who was 65 years of age or older.

There were 564 housing units, of which 11.5% were vacant. The homeowner vacancy rate was 3.4% and the rental vacancy rate was 2.9%.

Racial composition as of the 2020 census
Race	Number	Percent
White	1,872	86.0%
Black or African American	259	11.9%
American Indian and Alaska Native	1	0.0%
Asian	0	0.0%
Native Hawaiian and Other Pacific Islander	0	0.0%
Some other race	13	0.6%
Two or more races	31	1.4%
Hispanic or Latino (of any race)	20	0.9%

=== 2000 census ===
As of the census of 2000, there were 1,193 people, 509 households, and 294 families residing in the city. The population density was 599.6 inhabitants per square mile (231.5/km^{2}). There were 561 housing units at an average density of 282.0 per square mile (108.9/km^{2}). The racial makeup of the city was 98.99% White, 0.42% African American, 0.42% Asian, and 0.17% from two or more races. Hispanic or Latino of any race were 0.25% of the population.

There were 509 households, out of which 30.1% had children under the age of 18 living with them, 31.8% were married couples living together, 23.0% had a female householder with no husband present, and 42.2% were non-families. 39.7% of all households were made up of individuals, and 18.7% had someone living alone who was 65 years of age or older. The average household size was 2.11 and the average family size was 2.82.

In the city, the population was spread out, with 23.6% under the age of 18, 9.3% from 18 to 24, 22.3% from 25 to 44, 20.1% from 45 to 64, and 24.6% who were 65 years of age or older. The median age was 40 years. For every 100 females, there were 69.9 males. For every 100 females age 18 and over, there were 63.3 males.

The median income for a household in the city was $12,336, and the median income for a family was $21,181. Males had a median income of $28,125 versus $16,250 for females. The per capita income for the city was $13,850. About 39.1% of families and 41.2% of the population were below the poverty line, including 48.7% of those under age 18 and 33.0% of those age 65 or over.

=== Income and poverty ===
In 2010, Beattyville had the third-lowest median household income of all places in the United States with a population over 1,000. It was the poorest majority white town.

== Economy ==
The town's economy used to be based on coal mining, but this industry has pulled out of the area.

In the 21st century, major employers in Beattyville and Lee County include:

- Three Forks Regional Jail (multi-county jail serving the east-central area of Kentucky, including Powell, Wolfe, Owsley, and Breathitt counties)
- ACS, Affiliated Computer Systems (data and transaction processing)
- Lee County Public Schools, the largest employer in Beattyville
- Lee County Wood Products (sawmill)
- Kentucky River Community Care (mental health facility serving the east Kentucky region)
- People's Exchange Bank. Previously, the bank had its headquarters and two locations in Beattyville. The bank closed its downtown branch and moved its headquarters to Winchester, keeping one branch open in Beattyville.
- Experience Works, Inc (non-profit organization and largest national grantee of Senior Community Service Employment Program (SCSEP) funds from the U.S. Department of Labor)
- Lee County Care and Rehabilitation Center (nursing Facility with a 120-bed capacity)

The Lee Adjustment Center was constructed here and operated by Corrections Corporation of America as a private, for-profit, medium security prison, with a capacity of 800 inmates. The county hoped to provide jobs for local people at the prison. CCA had contracts with the states of Kentucky and Vermont to house prisoners here. Vermont prisoners rioted in 2004 and were joined by Kentucky prisoners. Kentucky removed its last inmates in 2010, and ended its contract with a CCA in 2013. Vermont removed its inmates in 2015. In November 2017, due to overcrowding at state owned facilities, the Kentucky Department of Corrections signed a new contract allowing CCA, now known as CoreCivic, to reactivate the vacant prison. These inmates would be transferred from the Kentucky State Reformatory in LaGrange. The prison reopened and began accepting inmates in March 2018.

== Woolly Worm Festival ==
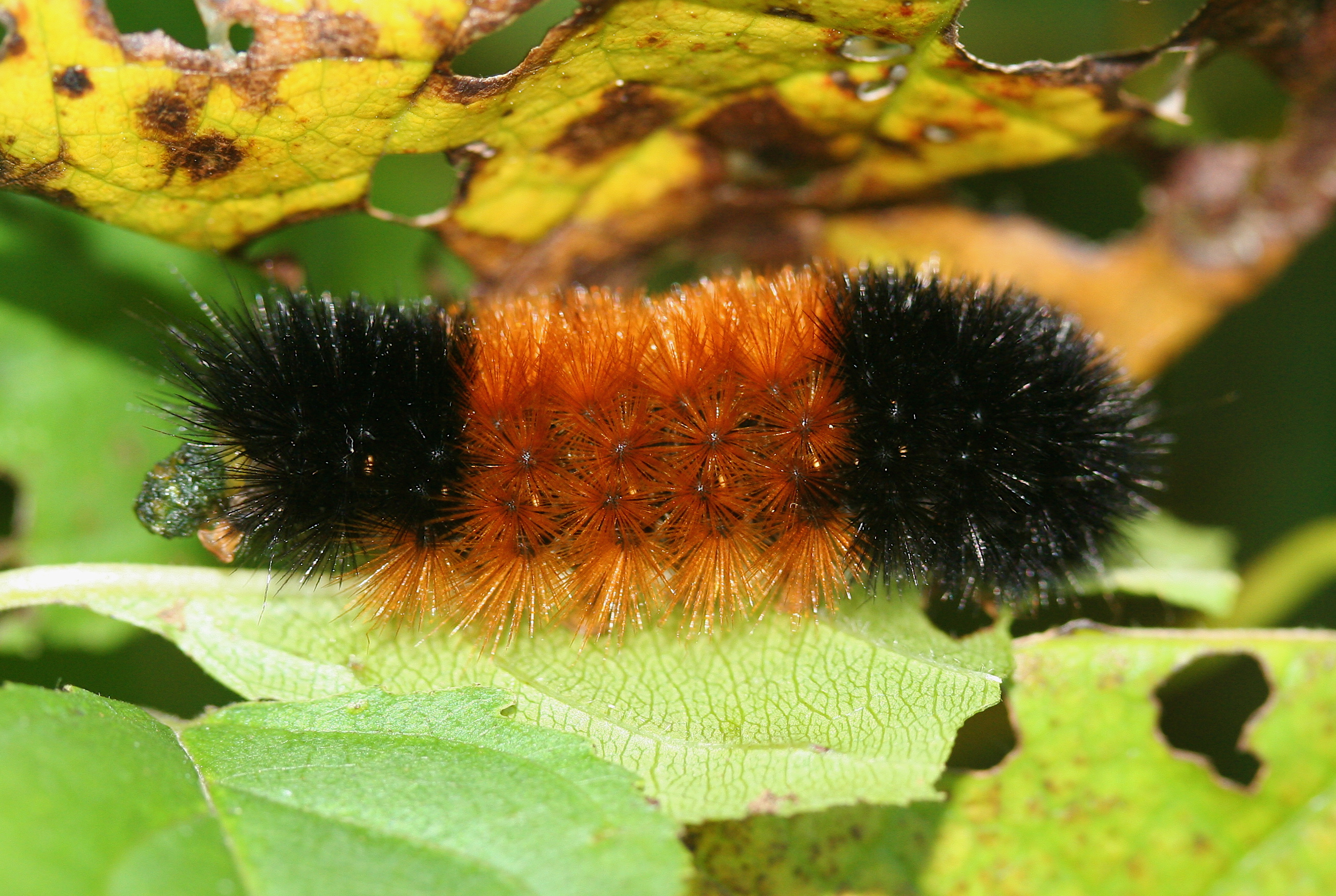
Pyrrharctia isabella is the scientific name of the "woolly worm" celebrated in the festival.

Since 1988, during the third weekend after the first Monday of October, the Main Street of Beattyville is closed to traffic for the annual Woolly Worm Festival. It operates for three days: Friday-"Opening Day", Saturday-"Parade Day", and Sunday-"Closing Day" (which also features a large car show).

The name "woolly worm" refers to the woolly bear caterpillar. The official mascot, "Woolly the Woolly Worm", is used as an image on some local merchandise and flyers. A round hay bale caricature of him stands beside the welcome sign to Beattyville. The festival is the outgrowth of a series of stories by Beattyville native Rosemary Kilduff (wife of Malcolm Kilduff) that tracked the predictions of winter weather based on local folklore. The severity of upcoming winter weather was said to be foretold by the relative proportions of black to brown coloration of the caterpillars. Kilduff penned columns in the local newspaper in the 1980s that collected woolly worm sightings by local residents.

During the festival, numerous musicians perform almost constantly on one of two stages, and dozens of booths offer a wide variety of merchandise and food. Helicopter tours of Beattyville and Lee County are available. The "Woolly Worm Races" are won by coaxing one of these "Hairy Caterpillars" to the top of a string. The first one to reach the top wins, with the only rule being "No Touching"; there is usually a cash prize for the winner.

The Woolly Worm Festival continues as a popular event attracting numerous tourists. Beattyville is a few minutes from Natural Bridge State Resort Park, another tourist destination.

== Education ==
Beattyville is served by the Lee County School District. Schools serving Beattyville include:

- Lee County Elementary School (Unincorporated area)
- Lee County Middle School
- Lee County High School
- Lee County Area Technology Center
- Lee County Alternative Education School

There is also a Board of Education and Central Office Complex building.

The Lee County Board of Education has announced plans to close Beattyville Elementary and transfer the students to Southside Elementary. To accommodate the influx of students, an expansion of the facilities at Southside will be required. The decision was not popular with residents of the community The Board of Education exhausted its bonding capacity to fund the addition to Southside, so it proposed a tax increase in 2013 to fund other repairs at other facilities. Residents of the county signed a petition to place the tax increase on the ballot. The school board decided to delay the implementation of the tax until 2014 so as not to have to pay approximately $20,000 to fund a special election. The school board passed the tax in 2014 and again, a petition was filed placing the matter on the ballot for the fall 2014 general election. The proposed tax increase was defeated by a large margin at the polls.

Two private schools serve the area as well: Beattyville Christian Academy and Grace Baptist Academy.

=== Higher education ===
There are no higher education opportunities in Beattyville or Lee County. A number of technical colleges and universities are located within a 60-mile (100 km) drive.

- Hazard Community and Technical College, Lees College Campus, 18 miles
- Kentucky Mountain Bible College, 24 miles
- Berea College, 53 miles
- Eastern Kentucky University, 45 miles
- National College, Richmond Branch, 45 miles

=== Public library ===
Beattyville has a lending library, the Lee County Public Library.

== Public services ==
The Beattyville City Police Department serves the city, and the Beattyville/Lee County Volunteer Fire Department covers the city and county. Emergency medical services are provided through a combined city-county dispatch center on River Drive. Beattyville Waterworks and Beattyville Sewer are also located in the city hall building on Main Street.

== Healthcare ==
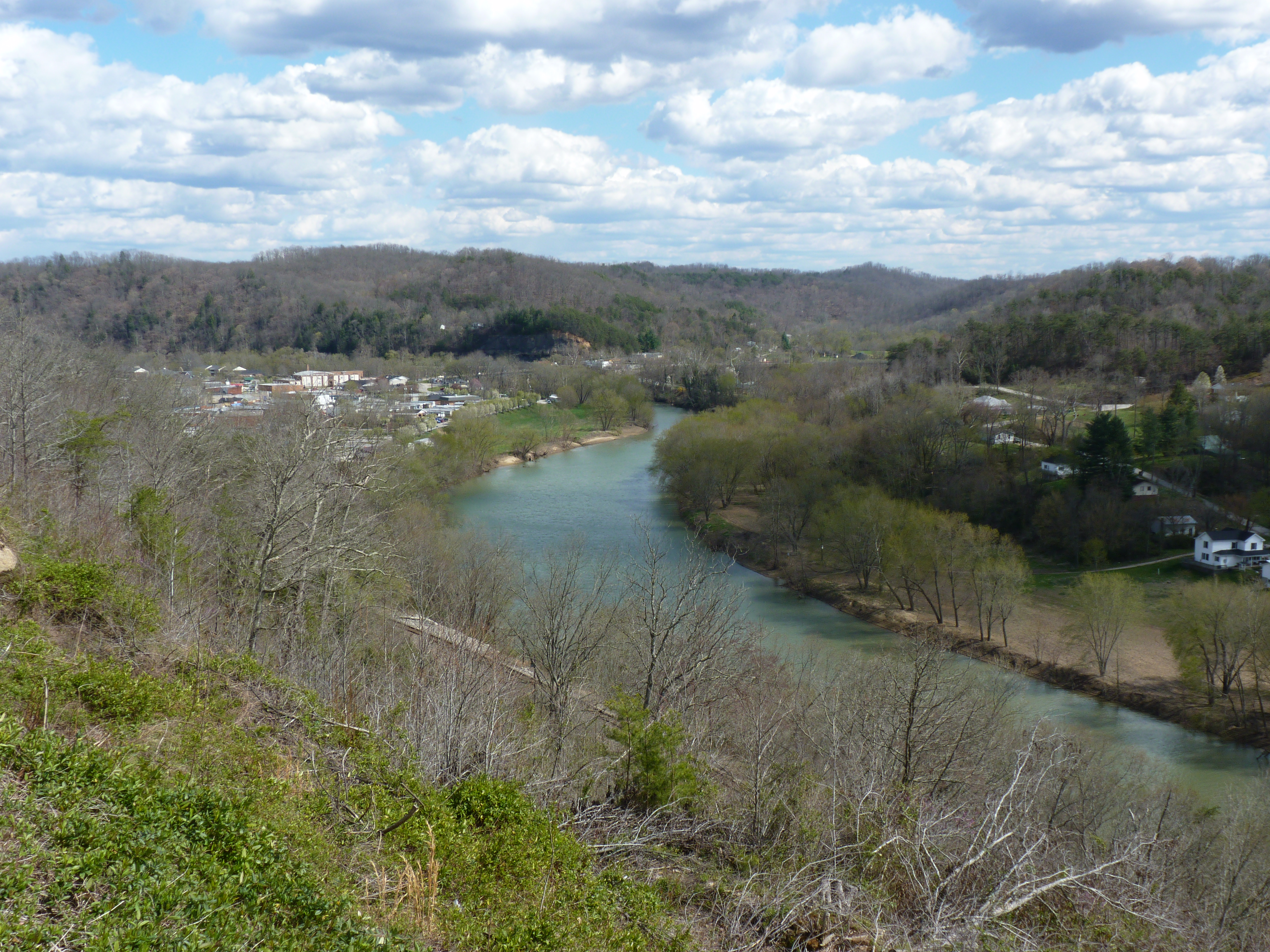
View of Beattyville from Happy Top Park

Beattyville has no hospital. Nearby facilities are in Irvine (Marcum and Wallace Memorial Hospital), Jackson (Kentucky River Medical Center), Winchester (Clark Regional Medical Center), Richmond (Baptist Health Richmond), Hazard (Hazard Appalachian Regional Medical Center), Manchester (Manchester Memorial Hospital), and several Lexington area hospitals.

Emergency medical services for Beattyville are provided by the Lee County Ambulance Service; they provide 24/7 Advanced Life Support and Basic Life Support emergency services to all citizens and visitors of Lee County. They transport patients primarily to Marcum and Wallace Memorial Hospital and KY River Medical Center, as well as providing non-emergency transportation services and a wheelchair transport van.

== Utilities ==
Beattyville is served by Kentucky Utilities, while much of Lee County is served by Jackson Energy, based in McKee, Kentucky, that serves south-central Kentucky. Licking Valley RECC serves Northern Lee County. Natural Gas is served by Columbia Gas of Kentucky and Delta Natural Gas Company. Two water services exist, Beattyville Water Works serves the city and most of the county, and Southside Water Association serves the southern and east parts of Lee County.

== Media ==
The television and radio station WLJC-TV/DT is headquartered in Beattyville. WLJC stands for Wonderful Lord Jesus Christ, and it is a Cozi TV affiliate and also produces local Christian programming. Station coverage extends north to Georgetown; west to Bardstown; south to Whitley City; and east to Pikeville. The station is owned by Hour of Harvest, Inc.

== Notable people ==
Malcolm Kilduff was involved in the announcing of the Assassination of John F. Kennedy.

Ian Noe, singer-songwriter.
