= Lem Johns =

United States Secret Service agent

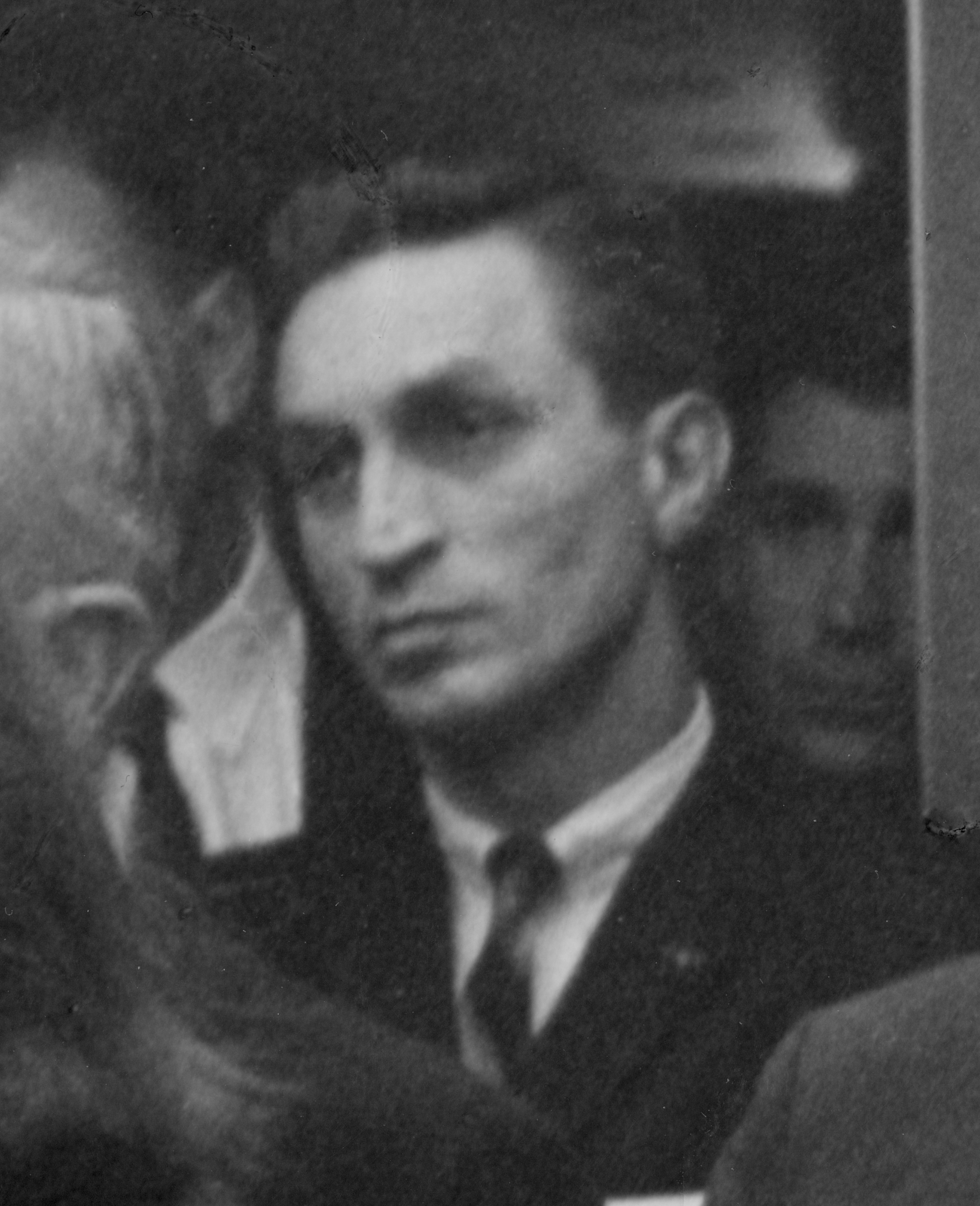
- Johns on November 22, 1963
- Born: Thomas Lemuel Johns; December 11, 1925; Birmingham, Alabama, United States
- Died: May 10, 2014 (aged 88); Hoover, Alabama, United States

Thomas Lemuel "Lem" Johns (December 11, 1925 – May 10, 2014) was a member of the United States Secret Service present during the assassination of John F. Kennedy and the first inauguration of Lyndon B. Johnson.

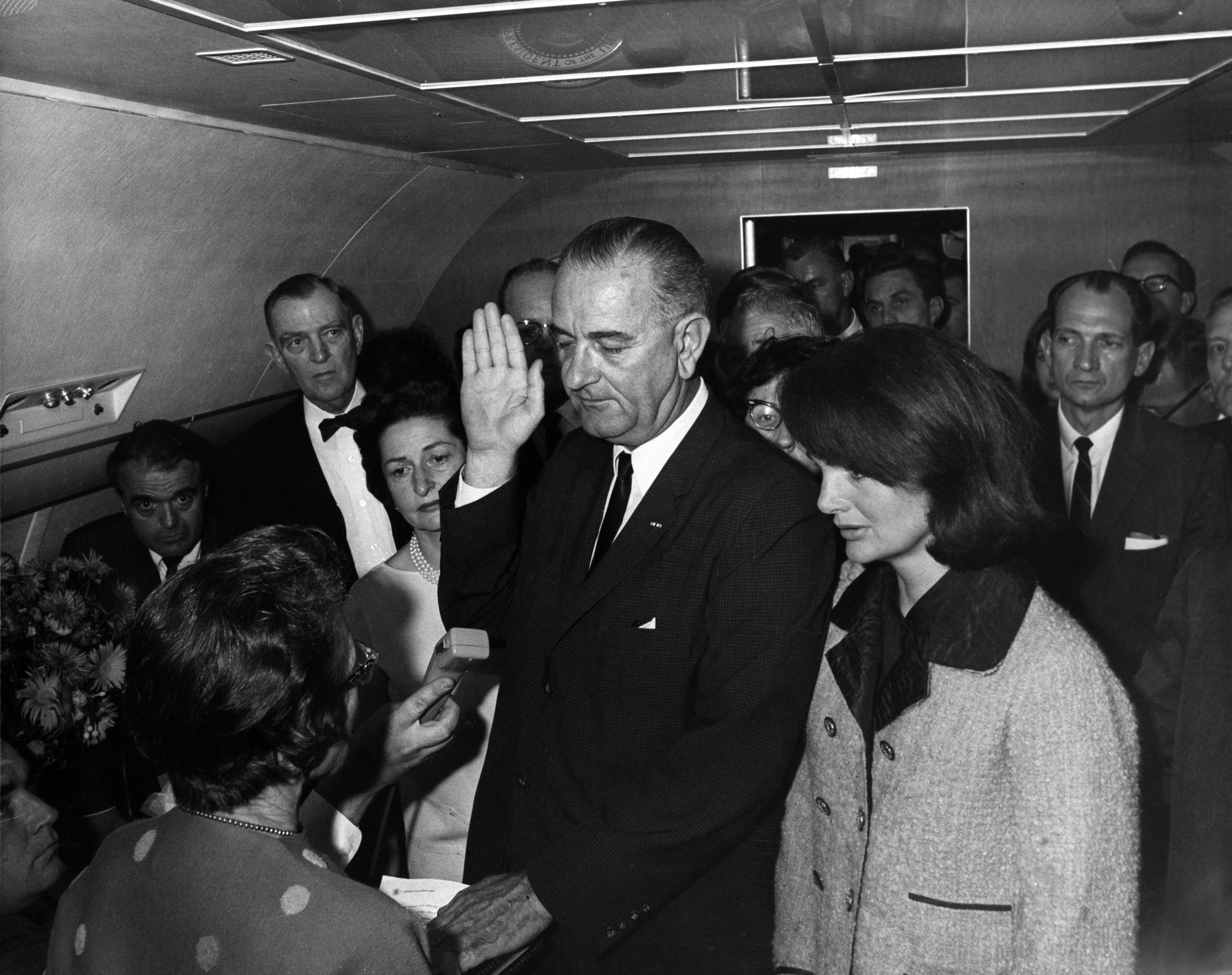
Lem Johns (center right, partially obscured by former First Lady Jacqueline Kennedy) witnesses the first inauguration of Lyndon B. Johnson as President of the United States, following the assassination of John F. Kennedy.

== Early life ==
Johns was born in and grew up in Birmingham, Alabama and served as a member of the United States Naval Air Corps during World War II.

== Education ==
Johns attended the University of Alabama and later graduated from Howard College (now Samford University).

== Career ==
Johns joined the Alcohol and Tobacco Tax Division of the Internal Revenue Service (the forerunner of the Bureau of Alcohol, Tobacco, Firearms and Explosives) in 1952. He joined the United States Secret Service in 1954 and served until 1976, including many years as head of the Birmingham field office.

== Death ==
Johns died in Hoover, Alabama on May 10, 2014.
