= List of people from Concord, Massachusetts =

The following list includes notable people who were born or have lived in Concord, Massachusetts.

== Writers ==
- Seth Abramson, poet
- Amos Bronson Alcott, teacher and writer
- Louisa May Alcott, novelist
- Amelia Atwater-Rhodes, novelist
- Jane G. Austin, writer of historical fiction
- William Ellery Channing, poet
- Patricia Cornwell, author
- George William Curtis, writer and speaker
- Edward Waldo Emerson, physician, writer and lecturer
- Lidian Jackson Emerson, abolitionist, wife of Ralph Waldo Emerson
- Ralph Waldo Emerson, essayist, poet and philosopher
- Will Eno, author and playwright
- Allen French, author and historian (including of the history of the town)
- Doris Kearns Goodwin, historian and writer
- Nathaniel Hawthorne, novelist and short story writer
- George Parsons Lathrop, poet and novelist
- Alan Lightman, physicist, novelist and essayist
- Gregory Maguire, author
- Russell Miller, author and historian
- Robert B. Parker, author
- David Allen Sibley, ornithologist and author
- Margaret Sidney (pseudonym of Harriett Mulford Stone Lothrop), author
- Henry David Thoreau, author, naturalist and philosopher
- Gordon S. Wood, historian and author

== Journalists ==
- Frederic Hudson, journalist
- Joel Kurtzman, economist and journalist
- William Stevens Robinson, journalist
- Franklin Benjamin Sanborn, journalist, author and reformer

== Musicians ==
- Andrew McMahon, musician and lead singer of Something Corporate and Jack's Mannequin
- Dean Rosenthal, composer and musician

== Actors ==
- Paget Brewster, actress
- Steve Carell, actor, producer, and director (lived in Acton but attended the Fenn School and the Middlesex School)
- Chris Evans, actor
- Scott Evans, actor
- John Augustus Stone, actor, dramatist and playwright

== Athletes ==
- Bob Asbjornson, Major League Baseball player
- Laurie Baker, USA ice hockey gold medalist
- Michael Fucito, soccer player
- Hal Gill, National Hockey League player
- Tom Glavine, Major League Baseball player
- Dick Kazmaier, Princeton college football player who was the last Ivy League Heisman Trophy winner
- Kara Mann, strongwoman and chemical engineer
- Uta Pippig, marathon runner
- Sam Presti, NBA executive
- John Tortorella, former NHL head coach

== Politicians ==
- Chris Abele, county executive of Milwaukee County, Wisconsin
- Charles A.P. Bartlett, Pennsylvania state senator
- George M. Brooks, U.S. representative
- Simon Brown, 21st lieutenant governor of Massachusetts
- William Emerson, minister, father of Ralph Waldo Emerson
- Richard Fadden, CSIS director
- Richard N. Goodwin, advisor and speechwriter to Presidents Kennedy and Johnson
- Ebenezer R. Hoar, U.S. attorney general
- George Frisbie Hoar, U.S. congressman and senator
- Samuel Hoar, U.S. congressman
- Henry J. Hosmer, Massachusetts state senator
- Jonas Wheeler, Maine Senate president
- William Whiting, lawyer, writer and politician
- Samuel Willard, 17th-century colonial minister
- Simon Willard, 17th-century intellectual and former British major who co-founded Concord

== Military ==
- Charles Francis Adams Jr., Civil War colonel, Union Army, great-grandson of President John Quincy Adams
- Charles Francis Adams III, 44th secretary of the Navy
- Oscar C. Badger, U.S. Navy officer
- John Buttrick, Concord militia leader
- Frederick Heyliger, Easy Company commander and member of the "Band of Brothers"
- Jonathan Hoar, colonial soldier
- Benjamin Ralph Kimlau, Chinese American aviator killed in action during World War II
- Samuel Prescott, American Revolutionary War, involved in "The Ride" with Paul Revere and William Dawes
- Thomas Wheeler, soldier in King Philip's War

== Others ==
- Samuel Bartlett, silversmith
- Tim Berners-Lee, British computer scientist, best known as the inventor of the World Wide Web
- Frank Hagar Bigelow, U.S. astronomer and meteorologist
- Daniel Bliss, jurist, proscribed by the Massachusetts Banishment Act
- Peter Bulkley, Puritan preacher and a co-founder of Concord
- Ephraim Bull, inventor of the Concord grape
- Darby Conley, cartoonist
- Bob Diamond, former chief executive of Barclays
- Daniel Chester French, sculptor
- William Watson Goodwin, classical scholar
- John Hoar, redeemer of famed captive Mary Rowlandson during King Philip's War
- Dick Hustvedt, software engineer
- Edward Holton James, socialist
- Edward Jarvis, physician and statistician
- Har Gobind Khorana, Indian American biochemist who shared the 1968 Nobel Prize for Physiology or Medicine
- Lynn Harold Loomis, mathematician and co-discoverer of the Loomis–Whitney inequality
- Alfred W. McCoy, historian and educator
- Patrick McHale, screenwriter, creator of Over the Garden Wall
- Jane Mendillo, CEO of Harvard Management Company
- Abigail May Alcott Nieriker, artist
- Betty Parris, Salem witch trials accuser
- Ezra Ripley, clergyman
- Alice Ruggles Sohier, painter
- Robert Solow, Nobel laureate in economics
- Stephen Wolfram, British-born scientist and developer of Mathematica software
- Chris Wysopal, entrepreneur and cybersecurity pioneer

== See also ==
- List of people from Massachusetts
