= John Malcolm Forbes =

American politician and yacht racer from Massachusetts

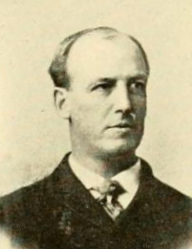
- Born: February 7, 1847; Milton, Massachusetts, U.S.
- Died: February 19, 1904 (aged 57)
- Other name: J. Malcolm Forbes
- Known for: Horse breeding of Standardbred horses
- Spouses: Sarah Coffin Jones; Rose Dabney
- Parent(s): John Murray Forbes and Sarah Hathaway Forbes
- Relatives: Son-in-law: Raymond Emerson

John Malcolm Forbes (February 2, 1847 – February 19, 1904) was an American businessman and sportsman. Born in Milton, Massachusetts, he was a member of the wealthy Forbes family of Boston, with his father being John Murray Forbes. He was a yachtsman and breeder of Standardbred horses. He also served in the Massachusetts House of Representatives in 1896.

== Horses ==
He purchased Nancy Hanks for $41,000 and Arion for $125,000. With Arion, Bingen, Nancy Hanks, Peter The Great, and others, Forbes Farm became the outstanding stud farm in the East. Forbes main objective is to improve the quality of the light driving horse, which, before the advent of the automobile, was in great demand throughout the country. Though Forbes never raced a stable, he was an expert on breeding fast horses, until his death in 1904. Forbes made national headlines by paying Senator Leland Stanford of California the enormous sum, at the time, of $125,000 for the stallion Arion.

== America's Cup ==
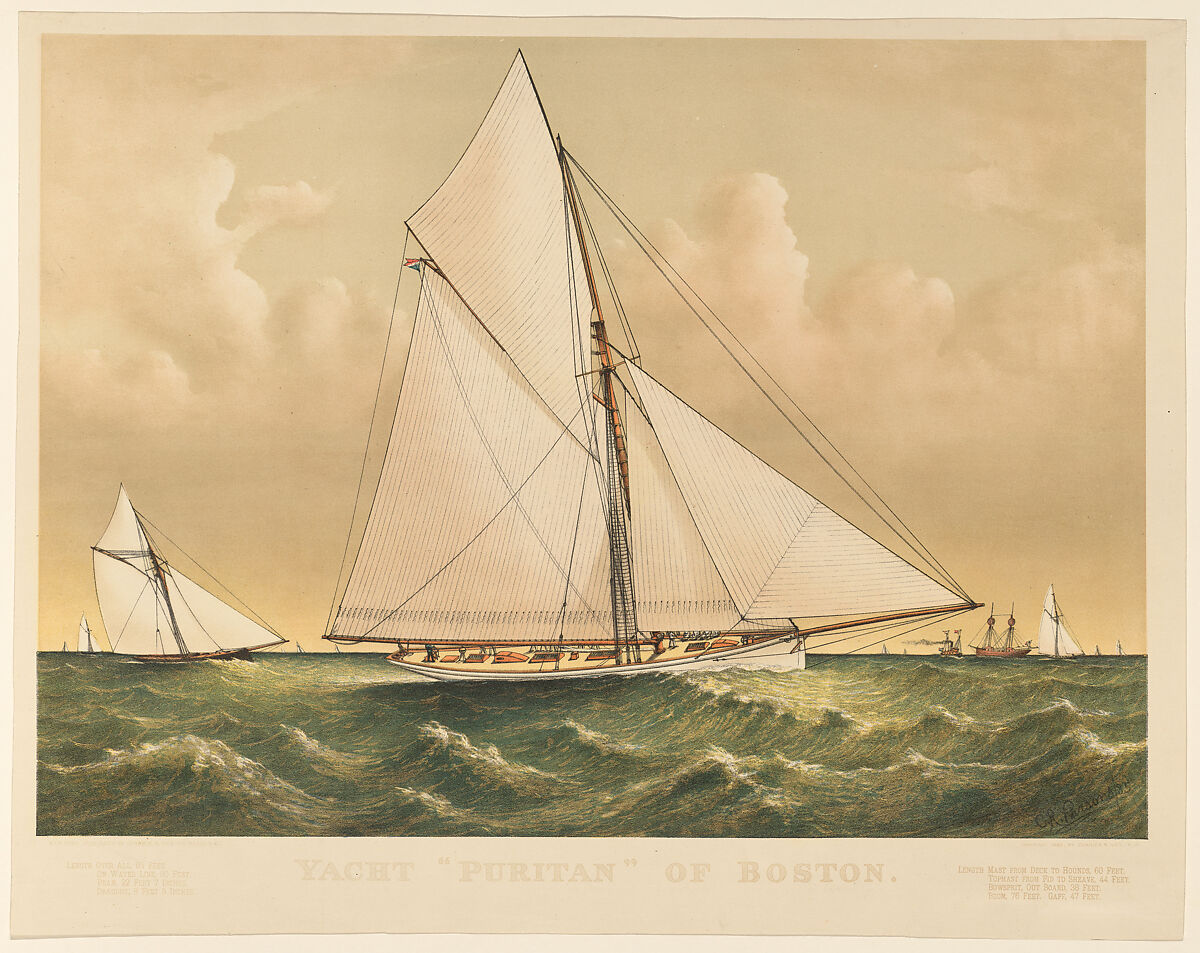
The printing firm Currier & Ives published a print of the yacht "Puritan," skippered by John Malcom Forbes, when it won the America's Cup in 1885.

Forbes owned the yacht Puritan which successfully defended the America's Cup in 1885.

In 1885, Forbes led the first of three successful America's Cup defense efforts for the New York Yacht Club. Edward Burgess was the designer and the syndicate initially funded and campaigned Puritan to a successful defense in 1885 and became a template for America's Cup campaign management, which was used throughout the 20th century.

== Descendants ==
Forbes is the ancestor of American television producer Jonathan Meath.

His brother and daughter both married into the Emerson family. Daughter Amelia Forbes married Raymond Emerson, grandson of Ralph Waldo Emerson. Decades earlier, brother William Hathaway Forbes had married Edith Emerson, daughter of Ralph Waldo Emerson.

Joseph Emerson
William Emerson Sr.
William Emerson	Mary Moody Emerson
Ralph Waldo Emerson	Lidian Jackson Emerson	John Murray Forbes
Edward Waldo Emerson	John Malcolm Forbes
Raymond Emerson	Amelia Forbes
