= The Old Manse =

Historic house in Massachusetts, United States

- Old Manse
- U.S. National Register of Historic Places
- U.S. National Historic Landmark
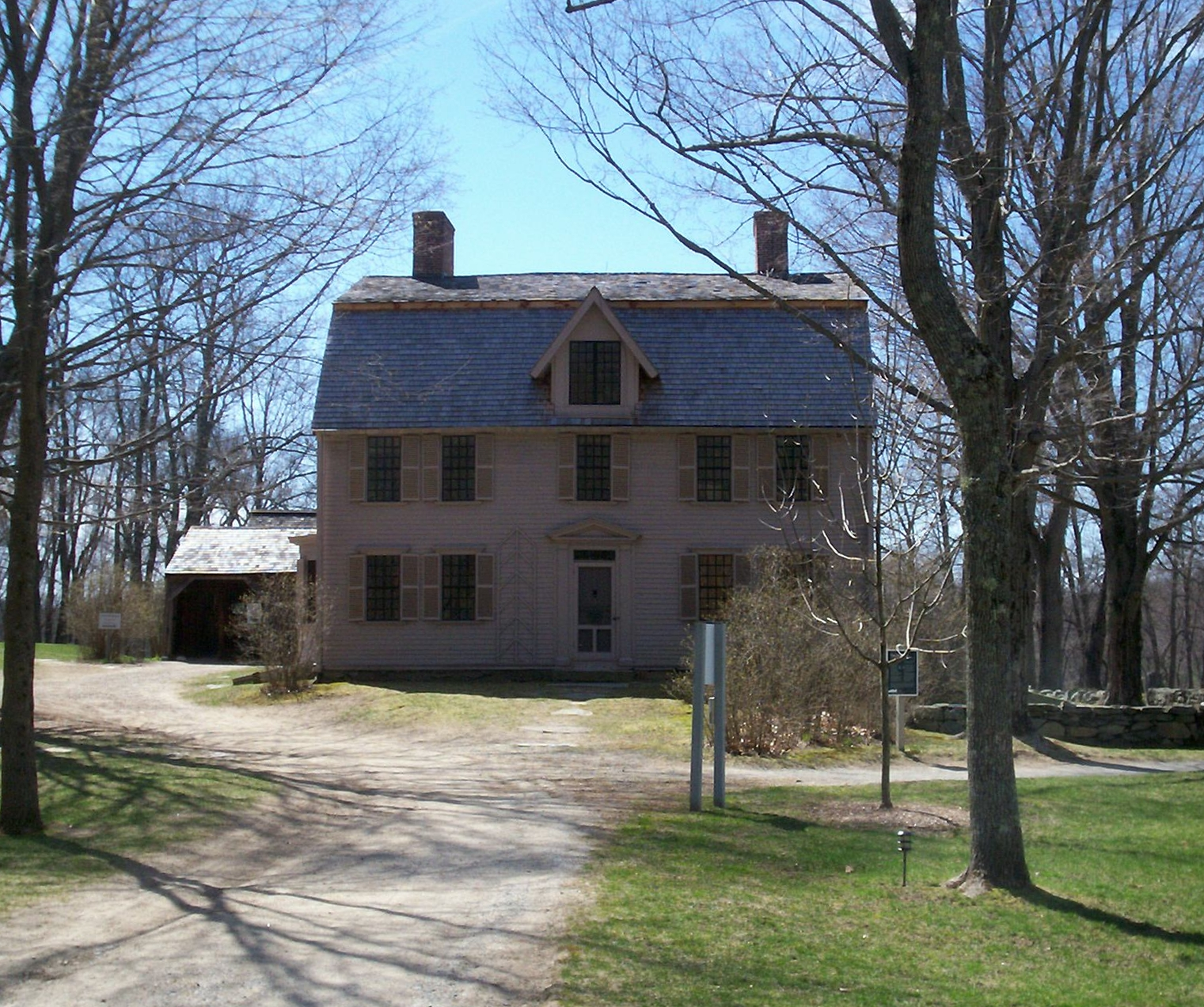
- The Old Manse, as seen from Monument Street

- Location within Massachusetts Location within the United States
- Location: Concord, Massachusetts
- Coordinates: 42°28′6″N 71°20′58″W
- Built: 1770
- Architectural style: Georgian
- NRHP reference No.: 66000775

Significant dates
- Added to NRHP: October 15, 1966
- Designated NHL: December 29, 1962

The Old Manse is a historic manse in Concord, Massachusetts, United States, notable for its literary associations. It is open to the public as a nonprofit museum owned and operated by the Trustees of Reservations. The house is located on Monument Street, with the Concord River just behind it. The property neighbors the Old North Bridge, a part of Minute Man National Historical Park.

The home, built in 1770 by the Emerson family, was a witness to the Battle at the North Bridge in 1775. The original owner's grandson, Ralph Waldo Emerson, later commemorated that event in his poem "Concord Hymn" in 1837. Another occupant of the house, Nathaniel Hawthorne, referenced the home in his collection of stories Mosses from an Old Manse in 1846. The house was in use by the Emerson-Ripley family until 1939, when the Trustees of Reservations became caretakers. It is now open to the public as a museum.

== History ==
=== Emerson years ===
The Old Manse was built in 1770 for the Rev. William Emerson, father of minister William Emerson and grandfather of transcendentalist writer and lecturer Ralph Waldo Emerson. The elder Rev. Emerson was the town minister in Concord, chaplain to the Provincial Congress when it met at Concord in October 1774 and later a chaplain to the Continental Army. Emerson observed the fight at the Old North Bridge, a part of the Concord Fight, from his farm fields while his wife (Phebe Bliss Emerson) and children witnessed the fight from the upstairs windows of their house.

Emerson died in October 1776 in West Rutland, Vermont, while returning home from Fort Ticonderoga. His widow, Phebe Emerson, remarried to the Rev. Ezra Ripley, who succeeded Emerson as the minister at First Parish Church in Concord. Their family continued to live in the Old Manse. Ripley served as Concord's town minister for 63 years.

In October 1834, Ralph Waldo Emerson moved to Concord and boarded at the Manse where he lived with his aging step-grandfather Ezra Ripley. He shared the home with his mother Ruth, his brother Charles, and his aunt Mary Moody Emerson. While there, he wrote the first draft of his essay "Nature", a foundational work of the Transcendentalist movement. Also while living at the Old Manse, on January 24, 1835, Emerson proposed in a letter to Lydia Jackson. After their marriage, they moved elsewhere in Concord, to a home he named "Bush", now known as the Ralph Waldo Emerson House.

=== Hawthorne years ===
In 1842, the American writer Nathaniel Hawthorne rented the Old Manse for $100 a year. He moved in with his wife, transcendentalist Sophia Peabody, on July 9, 1842, as newlyweds. Peabody had previously visited Concord and met Ralph Waldo Emerson while working on a bas-relief portrait medallion of his brother Charles Emerson, who had died in 1836. She praised the town to Hawthorne, who responded, "Would that we could build our cottage this very now amid the scenes. My heart thirsts and languishes to be there". Prior to their arrival at the Manse, Henry David Thoreau created a vegetable garden for the couple. The garden, intended as a wedding gift, included beans, peas, cabbages, and squash.

The Hawthornes lived in the house for three years. In the upstairs room that Hawthorne used as his study, the pair etched affectionate statements into the window panes. The inscription reads:

Man's accidents are God's purposes. Sophia A. Hawthorne 1843
Nath Hawthorne This is his study
The smallest twig leans clear against the sky
Composed by my wife and written with her diamond
Inscribed by my husband at sunset, April 3 1843. In the Gold light.
SAH

On the first anniversary of his marriage, Hawthorne and his neighbor, poet Ellery Channing, searched the neighboring Concord River for the body of Martha Hunt, a local woman who drowned. Hawthorne wrote of the incident, "I never saw or imagined a spectacle of such perfect horror... She was the very image of death-agony." The incident inspired the climactic scene in his novel The Blithedale Romance (1852).

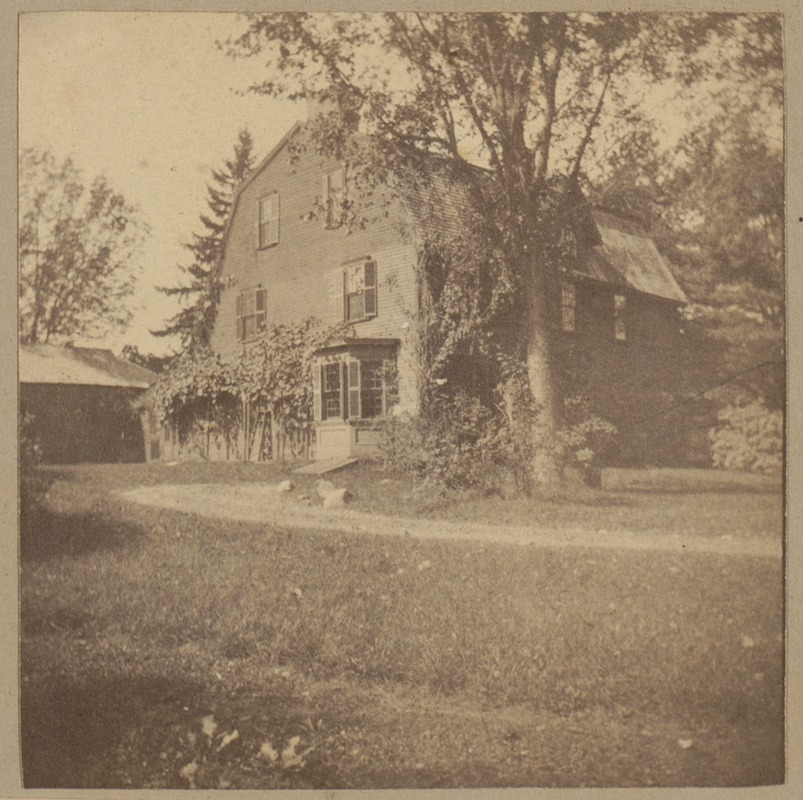
The Old Manse, ca. 1895–1905, from the Archive of Photographic Documentation of Early Massachusetts Architecture, Boston Public Library

The Hawthornes hosted several notable guests while living here. In May 1845, future President of the United States Franklin Pierce visited along with their mutual Bowdoin College friend Horatio Bridge. Peabody recalled the meeting fondly and recorded her first impression of Pierce as "loveliness and truth of character and natural refinement." Another visitor was Margaret Fuller, whose sister Ellen had married another Concord writer named Ellery Channing in 1842. Upon hearing of her engagement, Fuller had written to Sophia Peabody, "If ever I saw a man who combined delicate tenderness to understand the heart of a woman, with quiet depths and manliness enough to satisfy her, it is Mr. Hawthorne."

During his time in the Old Manse, Hawthorne published about twenty sketches and tales, including "The Birth-Mark" and "Rappaccini's Daughter", which would be included in the collection Mosses from an Old Manse (1846). In the introduction to that collection, he described the Old Manse: "Between two tall gateposts of roughhewn stone... we behold the gray front of the old parsonage, terminating the vista of an avenue of black ash trees." Apocryphally, the Hawthornes were forced out of the home for not paying their rent. In actuality, the Ripley family wanted to reclaim the home for themselves. The Hawthornes moved to Salem in 1845. Returning to Concord seven years later, by then living on the other side of town at The Wayside, Sophia Hawthorne visited the Old Manse on October 1, 1852, and referred to it as "the beloved old house".

=== Modern history ===
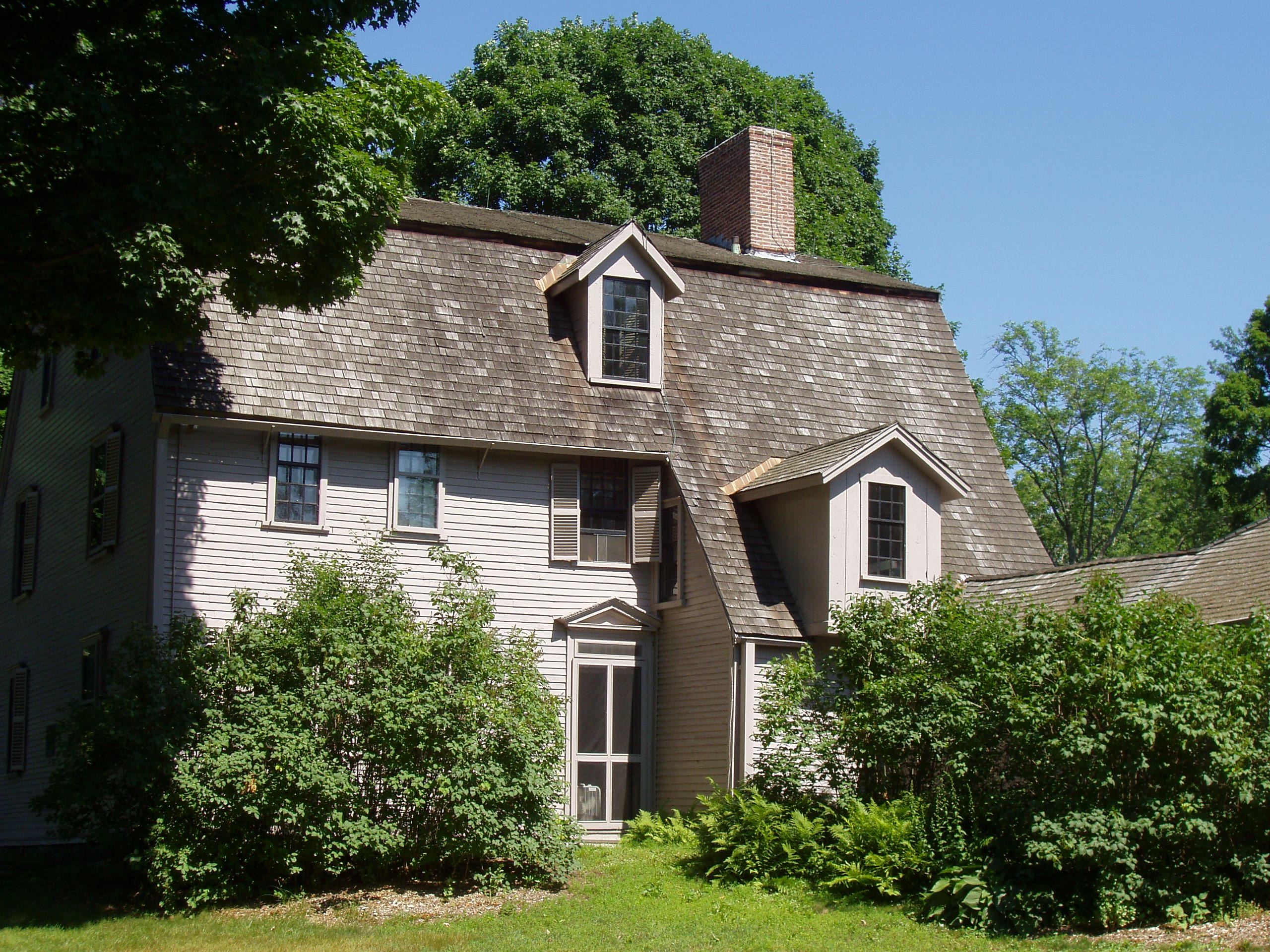
The Old Manse, viewed from its Concord River side

After the Hawthornes, the home was occupied by Sarah Bradford Ripley for several years. The house remained in use by descendants of the Emerson-Ripley family until 1939, and transitioned to the Trustees of Reservations on November 3, 1939. The house was conveyed complete with all its furnishings, and contains a remarkable collection of furniture, books, kitchen implements, dishware, and other items, as well as original wallpaper, woodwork, windows and architectural features.

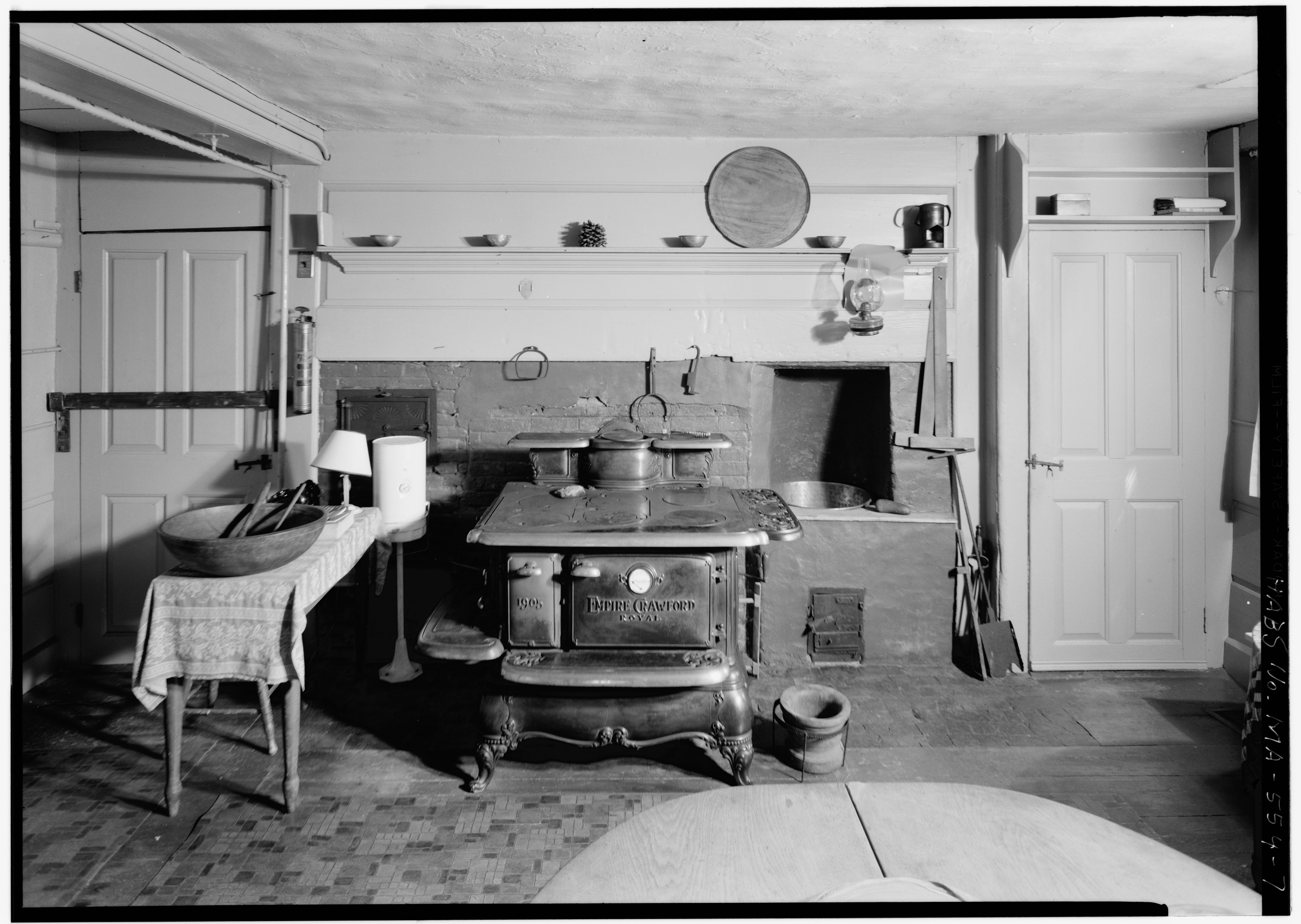
Frank O. Branzetti: Concord, The Old Manse

The Old Manse was designated a National Historic Landmark in 1966 and a Massachusetts Archaeological/Historic Landmark the same year.

The Manse is open seasonally for guided tours given by the Trustees of Reservations. The on-site book store in the house specializes in the American Revolution, women's history, the Emersons, the Hawthorne, Transcendentalism, and sustainability. The grounds include a recreation of the heirloom garden planted by Thoreau. Over 11,000 visitors are estimated per year.

== See also ==
- List of National Historic Landmarks in Massachusetts
- National Register of Historic Places listings in Concord, Massachusetts
