= Raymond Emerson =

American engineer (1886–1977)

- Born: November 28, 1886; Concord, Massachusetts, U.S.
- Died: October 27, 1977 (aged 90); Concord, Massachusetts, U.S.
- Education: Harvard University (1906–1911)
- Parent(s): Edward Waldo Emerson; Annie Shepard Keyes
- Relatives: Ralph Waldo Emerson (grandfather); Lidian Jackson Emerson (grandmother); John S. Keyes (grandfather); William Emerson (great-grandfather); John Malcolm Forbes (father-in-law)

Raymond Emerson (November 28, 1886 – October 27, 1977) was an American civil engineer, investment banker, and faculty at the Peabody Museum of Archaeology and Ethnology. He is known for his large donations of personal Ralph Waldo Emerson letters and other documents for educational purposes. He was part of the Emerson family, and was Ralph Waldo Emerson's last surviving grandson. In addition to his marriage to Amelia Forbes, he was also connected to the Forbes family through other marriages in his parents' and his own generations.

== Early life ==
Raymond Emerson was born to Dr. Edward Waldo Emerson and Annie Shepard Keyes on November 28, 1886, in Concord, Massachusetts. He was the youngest of seven children born to the couple, and one of only four that survived to adulthood. His father was the son of Ralph Waldo Emerson and Lidian Jackson Emerson, and his mother was the daughter of John S. Keyes and Martha Lawrence (Prescott) Keyes.

Raymond graduated from Harvard College in 1910.

== Business ==
Emerson worked as a civil engineer after graduating college. His surveying and engineering work took him across the United States and also to Canada and Brazil. In 1927, he joined J.M. Forbes & Co. in Boston as an investment banker and partner in the company. He continued as partner until 1958. His son David was also a partner in the same firm from 1956–86, which gave the two a two-year overlap of being partners at the same time.

Emerson worked closely and was good friends with William Henry Claflin Jr., both of whom were faculty at the Peabody Museum of Archaeology and Ethnology at Harvard University. In 1938 Raymond replaced Ingersoll Bowditch as a member of the museum faculty, and was part of the museum oversight body until he retired in 1956. In 1924, Raymond and Claflin funded an expedition into Southern Utah for survey and excavation work performed by John Otis Brew and others. This expedition became known as the Claflin-Emerson Expedition, which lasted four years. While at the museum, Raymond was "particularly involved" with Alfred V. Kidder under the latter's mentorship at the museum.

== Donations ==
After his death, Ralph Waldo Emerson's papers and works got passed down through the next generations, and Raymond allowed publications to use some of those works. He was considered the closest kin of Ralph Waldo Emerson after Ralph Waldo Emerson's children died.

Some of the works that Emerson let benefit from Ralph's work by waiving copyrights include:

- After Walden: Thoreau's Changing Views on Economic Man by Leo Stoller.
- The Days of Henry Thoreau by Walter Harding.
- The Letters of Ralph Waldo Emerson Volume One.
- The Letters of Ralph Waldo Emerson Volume Five.
- The Letters of Ralph Waldo Emerson, Volume 10.

Emerson also donated generously to the Peabody Museum, including funding some of its archaeological expeditions.

== Family and death ==
In August 1912, Emerson's engagement to the heiress Amelia Forbes was announced. Amelia was the daughter of the yachtsman and capitalist John Malcolm Forbes and Sarah Coffin Jones. The two were married April 12, 1913. Amelia's paternal grandfather was railroad magnate John Murray Forbes and she grew up in the mansion he built, called Fredonia, which had passed to Amelia's father. The Emerson and Forbes families were intermarried many times over.

Together, Emerson and his wife had six children: Ellen, born in 1914; David, born in 1916; Annie, born in 1918; Edward Waldo, born in 1920; William, born in 1923; and Hope, born in 1926.

Joseph Emerson
William Emerson Sr.
William Emerson | Mary Moody Emerson
Ralph Waldo Emerson | Lidian Jackson Emerson | John Murray Forbes
Edward Waldo Emerson | John Malcolm Forbes
Raymond Emerson | Amelia Forbes

Emerson died at age 90 on October 27, 1977, at his home in Concord, Massachusetts.
