= John S. Keyes =

American politician and jurist (1821–1910)

U. S. Marshal for the District of Massachusetts
- In office 1861–1867
- Preceded by: Watson Freeman
- Succeeded by: George Leonard Andrews

Sheriff of Middlesex County, Massachusetts
- In office 1853–1859
- Preceded by: Fisher Ames Hildreth
- Succeeded by: Charles Kimball

Personal details
- Born: September 19, 1821 Concord, Massachusetts, U.S.
- Died: February 21, 1934 (aged 64) Boston, Massachusetts, U.S.
- Resting place: Sleepy Hollow Cemetery; Concord, Massachusetts
- Party: Republican
- Spouse: Martha Lawrence Prescott (m. 1844; died 1895) Mary H. L. Grant (m. 1898)
- Children: 6
- Education: Harvard College
- Occupation: Lawyer

John Shepard Keyes (September 19, 1821 – May 15, 1910) was an American politician and jurist who was a member of the Massachusetts Senate (1849), sheriff of Middlesex County, Massachusetts (1853–1859), United States Marshal for the District of Massachusetts (1861–1867), and judge of the Concord District Court (1874–1910).

== Early life ==
Keyes was born on September 19, 1821, in Concord, Massachusetts, to John and Ann (Shepard) Keyes. He attended Concord's common schools and the Concord Academy. He graduated from Harvard College in 1841. He read law with his father and Edward Mellen and attended Harvard Law School (then known as Dane Law School). Keyes was admitted to the bar in 1844 and had a law office in Concord until 1853.

== Personal life ==
On September 19, 1844, Keyes married Martha Lawrence Prescott. They had six children, two of whom died in infancy. His daughter, Annie, married Edward Waldo Emerson (son of Ralph Waldo Emerson) and was the mother of Raymond Emerson. Martha Keyes died on December 2, 1895. On November 23, 1898, he married Mary H. L. Grant in Boston.

== Politics ==
Keyes held numerous elective and appointed offices in Concord, starting with superintendent of public grounds in 1849. He was chairman of the town's board of selectmen and school committee. He chaired the committee that purchased the land for and developed Sleepy Hollow Cemetery. In 1874, he oversaw the construction of the town's water system. He was also a member of the committee that oversaw the reconstruction of the Old North Bridge and the erection of The Minute Man. He held office in Concord continuously until 1901, when he resigned from the board of trustees of town donations, a position he had held since 1868.

Keyes was a member of the Massachusetts Senate during the 1849 Massachusetts legislature. He was appointed sheriff of Middlesex County in 1853. He was the first person elected sheriff when that office became an elected position in 1856. Keyes was a delegate to the 1860 Republican National Convention. He voted for William H. Seward, who lost the presidential nomination to Abraham Lincoln. In 1861, Keyes was appointed United States Marshal for the District of Massachusetts by president Lincoln. He left office in 1866 and returned to his farm in Concord.

In 1874, Keyes was appointed presiding justice of the Central Middlesex District Court by governor Thomas Talbot. In 1905, he oversaw the inquest into the Baker Bridge train wreck. The inquest concluded that engineer Horace W. Lyons was at fault for the crash and he was charged with manslaughter. The case was brought before a grand jury which found that Lyons "was greatly at fault in not slowing down sufficiently, and for disregarding the cautionary green lights...[and] red fusees", but chose not to indict him.

== Later life and death ==
Keyes resigned from the bench in 1910 due to ill health. He died on May 15, 1910, at Massachusetts General Hospital.
