= William Emerson (minister) =

American minister (1769–1811)

The Reverend William Emerson
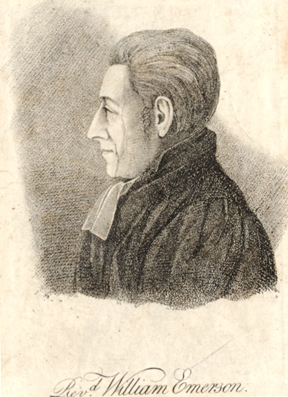
- Rev. William Emerson (published in Polyanthos 1812)
- Born: May 6, 1769; Concord, Province of Massachusetts Bay
- Died: May 12, 1811 (aged 42); Boston, Massachusetts
- Spouse: Ruth Haskins
- Children: 8

William Emerson (6 May 1769 – May 12, 1811) was one of Boston's leading citizens, a liberal-minded Unitarian minister, pastor to Boston's First Church and founder of its Philosophical Society, Anthology Club, and Boston Athenaeum, and father to Ralph Waldo Emerson.

== Biography ==
Emerson was born in Concord, Massachusetts on 6 May 1769, the fifth born and only son of William and Phebe (Bliss) Emerson.

=== Family and early life ===
William Emerson's grandfather, Joseph Emerson was a minister, as was his father, William Emerson Sr. Emerson's father built and inhabited The Old Manse at Concord. He was the chaplain to the Provincial Congress when it met at Concord in October 1774, and he was a chaplain to the Continental Army when war had begun. William Emerson Sr. died of camp fever while on campaign in 1776, when his son William Emerson was 7 years old.

William Emerson Jr. married Ruth Haskins on 25 October 1796 in Boston. She was the daughter of John Haskins of Boston. The Emersons had eight children:

- Phebe Ripley Emerson,
- John Clark Emerson,
- William Emerson III ,
- Ralph Waldo Emerson,
- Edward Blis Emerson,
- Robert Bulkeley Emerson,
- Charles Chauncy Emerson,
- Mary Caroline Emerson.

=== Education ===
William Emerson attended Harvard College, graduating in 1789. The Reverend Nathaniel Thayer of Lancaster, Massachusetts was his classmate. Prior to his ordination, Emerson taught school.

== Ministry ==
=== Harvard, MA: 1792–99 ===
On 21 December 1791, the Congregational Church and town of Harvard, Massachusetts extended the call to William Emerson to become their fifth minister. Emerson, who had been preaching on probation, accepted the call 9 April 1792 and was ordained on 23 May 1792. Present at his ordination were ministers from Acton, Boxborough, Concord, East Sudbury, and Littleton, Massachusetts. Concord's Ezra Ripley preached the ordination sermon on Acts 26:18. The town paid the Reverend Emerson $333.30 yearly. While in Harvard, Emerson organized a social library club, serving as its custodian.

On 17 June 1799, the First Church in Boston asked the Harvard church for Emerson's release so that he could become their minister.

=== Boston, MA: 1799–1811 ===
In 1799, the Reverend William Emerson was dismissed by the Harvard church to become the minister of Boston's First Church, for a bonus of a thousand dollars. After this initial interest, his sermons appear to have roused no great enthusiasm, as George Ticknor noted in the Christian Examiner, September, 1849: "Mr. Emerson, transplanted to the First Church in Boston six years before Mr. Buckminster's settlement, possessed, on the contrary, a graceful and dignified style of speaking, which was by no means without its attraction, but he lacked the fervor that could rouse the masses, and the original resources that could command the few." He was elected a Fellow of the American Academy of Arts and Sciences in 1803.

In 1804, Emerson founded the Anthology Club, a Boston literary society, and wrote articles for the club's The Monthly Anthology. This publication was the forerunner of the North American Review, America's leading literary journal at the time. The Club's reading room led to the founding in 1807 of the Boston Athenaeum.

In 1806, Emerson was the chaplain for the Massachusetts General Court.

The Reverend William Emerson is buried in the First Church, in Boston.

== Family tree ==
Joseph Emerson
William Emerson Sr.
William Emerson	Mary Moody Emerson
Ralph Waldo Emerson	Lidian Jackson Emerson
Edward Waldo Emerson	John Malcolm Forbes
Raymond Emerson	Amelia Forbes
