= Mary C. Wheeler =

American painter (1846–1920)

Mary Colman Wheeler
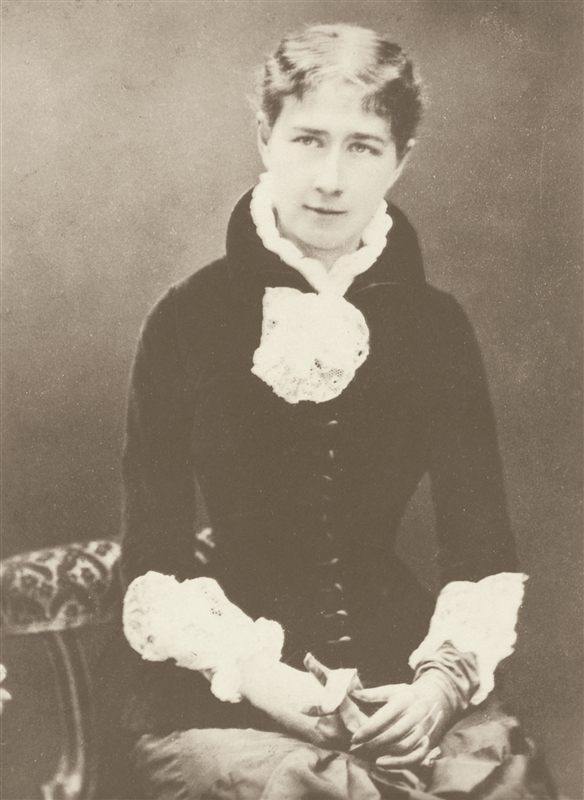
- Mary Colman Wheeler as a young woman
- Born: May 15, 1846; Concord, Massachusetts
- Died: March 10, 1920 (aged 73); Providence, Rhode Island
- Known for: Education, Painting

Mary Colman Wheeler (May 15, 1846 – March 10, 1920) was the founder and first head of the Wheeler School in Providence, Rhode Island.

== Early life and education ==
Born in Concord, Massachusetts, on May 15, 1846, to Abiel Heywood Wheeler and Harriet Lincoln, she was the youngest of five children. Concord was at the time of Wheeler's early life a progressive community engaged with Transcendentalism, abolitionism, education reform, and women's rights. Her father Abiel was involved in a local Underground Railroad effort and their family provided refuge to escaped slaves on their way to Canada throughout the 1850s.

Intellectual figures in the community at that time included Amos Bronson Alcott, Nathaniel Hawthorne, Horace Mann, Henry David Thoreau, and Ralph Waldo Emerson, among others. Local feminist Margaret Fuller died before Wheeler's time, but the "audacious" woman "left [an] impress on the village." Wheeler's ethical and intellectual beliefs were influenced by contact with women such as Mary Moody Emerson and the sisters Elizabeth Peabody, Mary Peabody (Mrs. Horace Mann), and Sophia Peabody (Mrs. Nathaniel Hawthorne).

Wheeler was an enthusiastic artist and took drawing lessons with her friend May Alcott beginning in 1858. Notably, May was youngest sister of writer Louisa May Alcott and inspired the character of Amy March in her novel Little Women.

She graduated from Concord High School in 1864 and Abbot Academy in Andover, Massachusetts in 1866.

== Career ==
In 1866, she started teaching mathematics and Latin at Concord High School and in 1868 moved to Providence, Rhode Island to teach mathematics at a Miss Shaw's, a finishing school. In the 1870s, she traveled to Germany, Italy and France to study art, while staying in Concord and teaching intermittently in Providence. She returned to Providence in 1882 to teach painting to women. In 1889, she founded the Wheeler School.

In 1887, Wheeler started a practice of taking groups of students to France during the summer to learn the French language and study painting and art history. She and the young women who accompanied her leased a property next to Claude Monet in Giverny, and became dinner companions of the Monet family. One of these young women was the painter Louise Herreshoff.

== Death ==
Wheeler died on March 10, 1920, after falling on an icy street. She is buried at Author's Ridge in Sleepy Hollow Cemetery in Concord.
