= William Emerson Sr. =

American clergyman and army officer (1743–1776)

- Born: May 31, 1743; Malden, Province of Massachusetts Bay
- Died: October 30, 1776 (aged 33); West Rutland, New Hampshire, now Vermont
- Occupation: Minister

William Emerson Sr. (May 31, 1743 – October 30, 1776) was an American Congregational minister from Concord, Massachusetts. He was the father of William Emerson Jr. and Mary Moody Emerson, and grandfather of Ralph Waldo Emerson.

== Life and career ==
The twelfth of thirteen children of the Reverend Joseph and Mary Moody Emerson, William was born in Malden, Massachusetts, just north of Boston, on May 31, 1743. He graduated from Harvard College in 1761 at age 18 and entered the ministry, serving as minister of Concord's First Congregational Church from 1766 until his death ten years later. Also in 1766, Emerson wed Phebe Bliss, daughter of Rev. Daniel Bliss, his predecessor in Concord. Bliss had been an evangelical aligned with the Great Awakening revival movement, and his allies, led by Dr. Joseph Lee, resisted Emerson's election as minister (one-third of town meeting voted against him) and clashed with Emerson throughout his tenure. The Old Manse was built to serve as Emerson's parsonage in 1770.

A staunch Patriot, Emerson was involved in the fight at the Old North Bridge in Concord, part of the Battles of Lexington and Concord in 1775. He also served as chaplain of the Massachusetts Provincial Congress and chaplain in the Continental Army, deploying to Fort Ticonderoga as part of Horatio Gates' army in 1776. He soon became sick from dysentery, received a medical discharge, and began traveling home to Concord. He died en route in West Rutland, Vermont, on October 30, 1776, at the age of 33.

His wife Phebe subsequently remarried to Ezra Ripley, Emerson's successor in ministry at Concord.

== Family tree ==
Joseph Emerson
William Emerson Sr.
William Emerson	Mary Moody Emerson
Ralph Waldo Emerson	Lidian Jackson Emerson
Edward Waldo Emerson	John Malcolm Forbes
Raymond Emerson	Amelia Forbes
