= Baker Bridge train wreck =

1905 train wreck in Massachusetts, U.S.

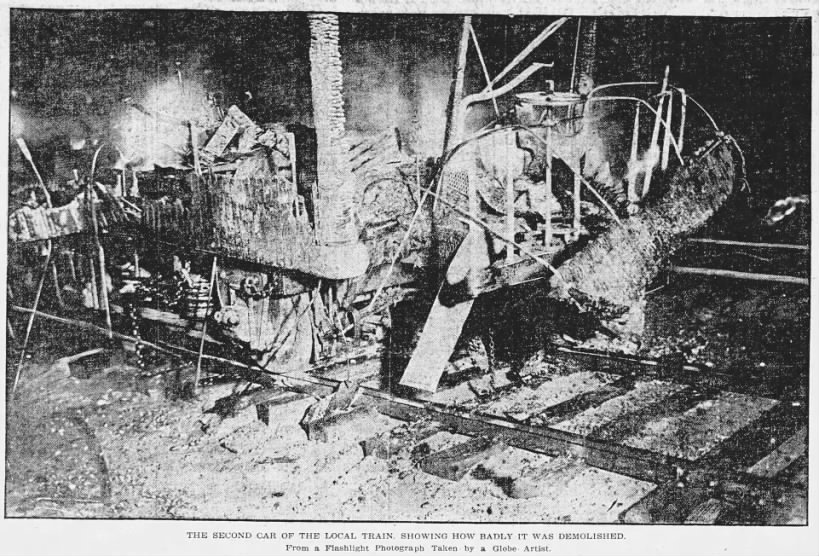
- A photograph of one wrecked railroad car as published in The Boston Globe

Details
- Date: November 26, 1905 (120 years ago); 8:15 pm
- Location: Baker Bridge station, Lincoln, Massachusetts
- Coordinates: 42°25′40″N 71°20′10″W
- Country: U.S.
- Line: Fitchburg line
- Operator: Boston and Maine Railroad
- Incident type: Rear-end collision between moving train and stopped train
- Cause: Failure of train driver to heed cautionary signals

Statistics
- Trains: 2
- Deaths: 17
- Injured: 33

The Baker Bridge train wreck occurred on November 26, 1905, in Lincoln, Massachusetts, when two passenger trains on the Fitchburg line of the Boston and Maine Railroad were involved in a rear-end collision. Seventeen people were killed in the wreck. Engineer Horace W. Lyons was charged with manslaughter; however, a grand jury chose not to indict him.

== Collision ==
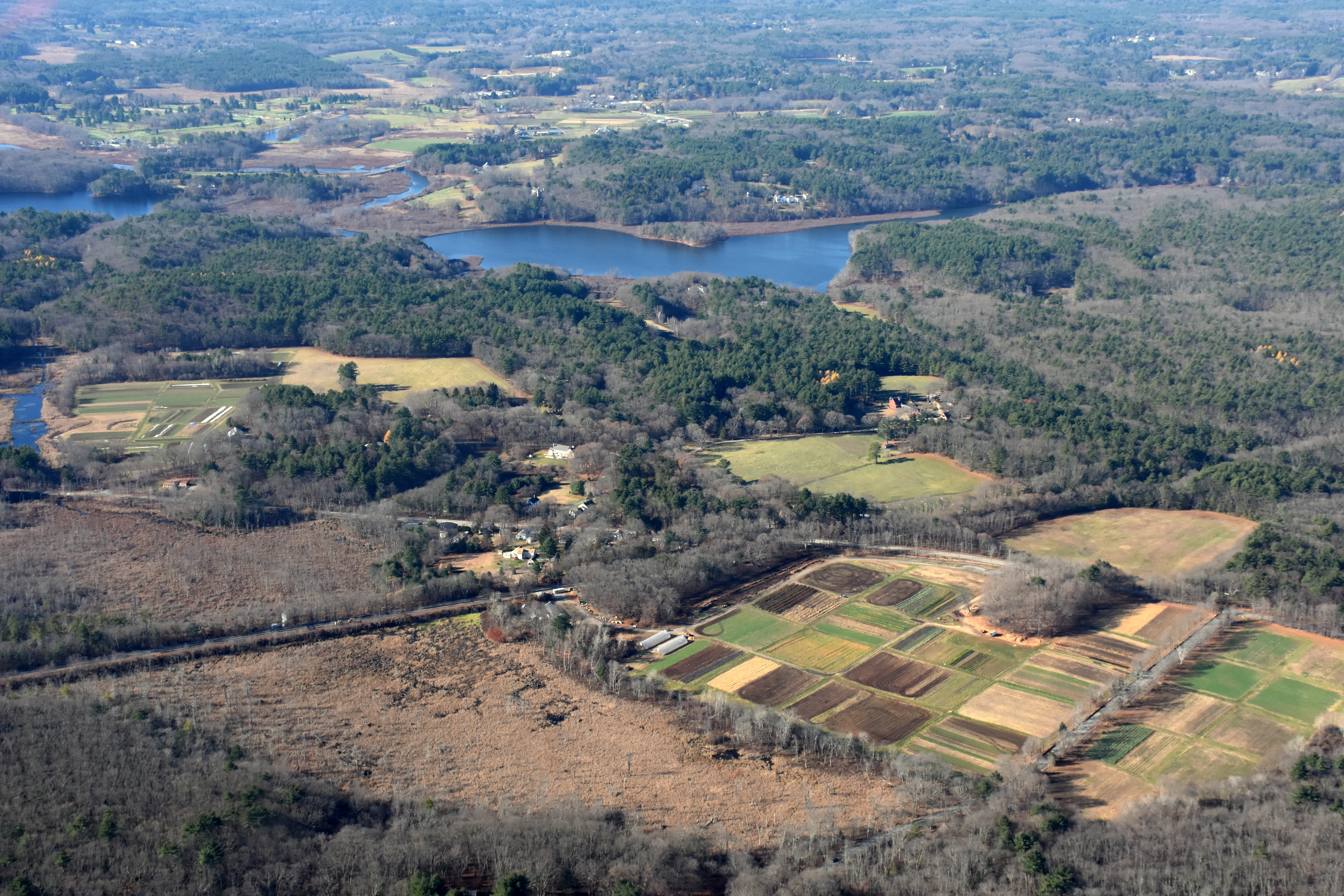
2015 view of the wreck site

At 7:16 pm, the Marlborough local train comprising one engine, one combination car, and three coaches left Boston's North Station on the Fitchburg line. At 7:45 pm, the Montreal express with two engines, two milk cars, two baggage cars, a mail car, a Pullman car, a smoker, and two coaches departed North Station on the same track as the Marlborough local. The express was to reduce its speed until Lincoln, where the two trains would be five minutes apart from each other.

The Marlborough train lost time around Waltham, and by the time it reached Baker Bridge station it was 2 1/2 to 4 minutes late. The rear brakeman threw down two red fusees to let the oncoming Montreal express that their train was stopped. A green spacing signal was also displayed at the Great Road crossing, over one-half mile (0.80 km) from the station.

Horace W. Lyons, the engineer of the first locomotive of the Montreal express, stated that he saw the fusees and the spacing signals and knew what they meant. He claimed to shut off his steam and eased on his brakes to reduce speed, however the engineer of the express' second locomotive claimed that Lyons never applied the brakes. Lyons' fireman was killed in the wreck, thus he could not corroborate or dispute Lyons' version of events.

At 8:15 pm, the Montreal express, traveling an estimated 25 miles per hour (40 km/h), collided into the back of the Marlborough train. The three rear cars of the Marlborough local were telescoped. Passengers were pinned under debris of the wrecked cars and what was left of the cars caught fire. Many of those who died were not found in the debris, but rather under the locomotives that pulled the Montreal train. Survivors were treated at the scene by physicians from Waltham, but, because there were insufficient local facilities to handle the disaster, passengers of the wrecked train were transported by train to Boston. During the trip, William H. Roberts, a spare train conductor, assisted in the identification of the deceased by looking through their personal effects. Upon arriving in the city, survivors were treated by surgeons from Massachusetts General Hospital and the deceased were brought to city morgues for a more thorough examination. 15 passengers and two railroad employees were killed and 32 passengers and one railroad employee were injured in the wreck.

== Investigations ==
=== B&M investigation ===
Lyons told a Boston and Maine representative that he had observed two cautionary block signals and two red-fire flares (fusees) that had been thrown by the brakeman of the local train, but by the time he reacted he was already upon the rear of the train. Witnesses testified that the brakeman had thrown the flares, and the burned-out flares were found near the tracks. Thomas F. McHugh, the station operator, stated that after the local train had left he hung a signal lantern out to notify passing trains that another train had just left the station.

On November 27, Boston and Maine President Lucius Tuttle released a statement stating that the primary cause of the accident was Lyons' failure to heed cautionary signals.

=== Keyes inquest ===
On November 29, Judge John S. Keyes of the Concord District Court held an inquest into the accident. The three-hour inquest saw testimony from 31 witnesses and evidence gathered by detectives from the Massachusetts State Police. Keyes chose to make the inquest private and reporters were not allowed in the courtroom. The inquest concluded that Lyons was at fault for the crash and he was charged with manslaughter.

=== Grand jury investigation ===
The case was brought before a grand jury which found that Lyons "was greatly at fault in not slowing down sufficiently, and for disregarding the cautionary green lights...[and] for disregarding the red fusees", but chose not to indict him.

The grand jury's report criticized the Boston and Maine Railroad's operating rules, which allowed an engineer to run his train as close to another train as he wanted and did not clearly assign the rear brakeman the duty of flagging oncoming trains when his train was stopped at a station. The jury also found B&M's system of signals to be inadequate, as it did not indicate that the stopped train was less than five minutes ahead and none of the signals required the oncoming train to fully stop. B&M's policy of assigning inexperienced engineers to express trains was criticized as well. The jury faulted B&M's working conditions, finding that they should not have permitted its engineers to work for 16 to 18 hours a day for five consecutive days.

The grand jury also faulted the crew of the local train for overrunning Baker Bridge station in such a way that it made it difficult for an oncoming train to see its rear lights and for not sending a flagman to stop the Montreal express.

=== Railroad commission report ===
The Massachusetts Railroad Commission held a public inquiry into the wreck. The commission's report stated that Lyons had seen at least one of the fusees as well as the spacing signal and failed in his duties by disregarding rules that required him to slow down. It also found that the railroad rules were too "uncertain and inconsistent" and "left too much discretion and responsibility with the train hands". Two rules the commission criticized were Rule 99, which required a flagman to deliver a danger signal if a train may be overtaken but in practice was only used if "something out of the usual course...had occurred" and Rule 703 which read that "Enginemen must never run past a red signal displayed on the track" but in practice did not apply to red fusees. The commission recommended having trains stop, then proceed with caution upon seeing a fusee or spacing signal, a rule that had previously existed on the Fitchburg line but had been done away with. The commission also recommended that the state legislature require railroads and street railways where trains or cars followed each other in quick succession to implement a signalling block system.

== Horace W. Lyons ==
Lyons was a 37-year-old native of Old Orchard Beach, Maine, then residing in Charlestown. He was hired as a fireman by the Fitchburg Railroad in 1898 and was kept on when the railroad was acquired by the Boston and Maine Corporation. In 1904, he passed his examination to become an engineer. Due to his lack of seniority, Lyons was not assigned his own train and worked as a spare engineer. Prior to the collision, Lyons had a fine record as a fireman and engineer.

Lyons spent many years in the employ of the Boston Elevated Railway. He died in Boston on October 30, 1949, at the age of 81. He was buried in Laurel Hill Cemetery in Saco, Maine.

== See also ==
- List of disasters in Massachusetts by death toll
