= Manse =

Clergy house

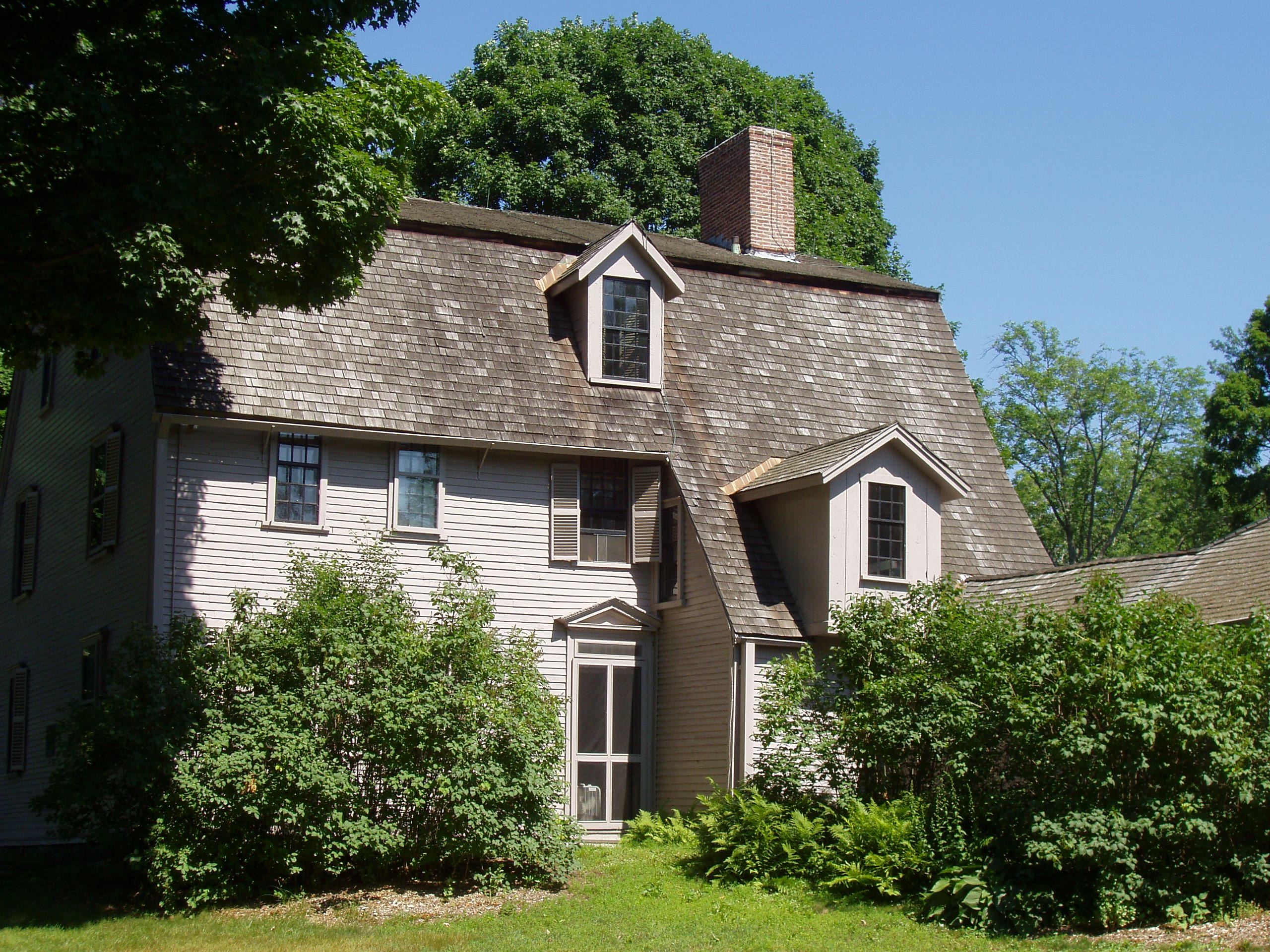
The Old Manse, Concord, Massachusetts.

A manse (/mæns/) is a clergy house inhabited by, or formerly inhabited by, a minister, usually used in the context of Presbyterian, Methodist, Baptist and other Christian traditions.

Ultimately derived from the Latin mansus, "dwelling", from manere, "to remain", by the 16th century the term meant both a dwelling and, in ecclesiastical contexts, the amount of land needed to support a single family.

Many notable Scots have been called "sons (or daughters) of the manse", and the term is a recurring point of reference within Scottish media and culture. For example, Prime Minister of the United Kingdom Gordon Brown was described as a "son of the manse" as he is the son of a Presbyterian minister. Other children of the manse include former PM Andrew Bonar Law; the athlete, Eric Liddell; inventor of the TV, John Logie Baird; actor, David Tennant; former MSP, Wendy Alexander, and journalist, Sheena McDonald.

When selling a former manse, the Church of Scotland always requires that the property should not be called "The Manse" by the new owners, but "The Old Manse" or some other acceptable variation. The intended result is that "The Manse" refers to a working building rather than simply applying as a name.

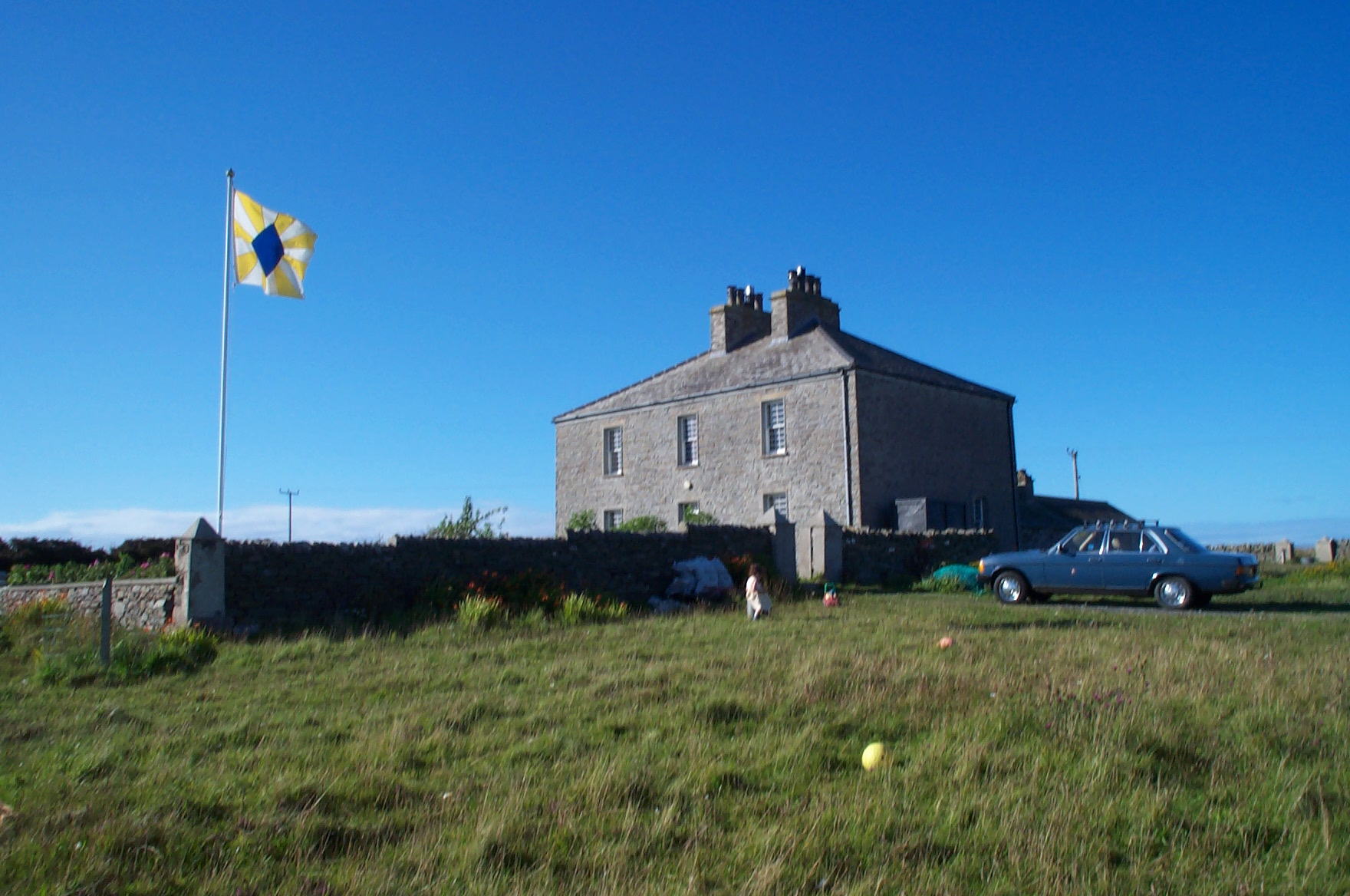
The West Manse, Sanday, Orkney, Scotland (formerly the Free Kirk manse)

== See also ==
- Glebe – an area of land within an ecclesiastical parish used to support a parish priest.
- List of children of clergy
- The Old Manse, a former manse in New England with literary associations, now a museum
