= Edward Waldo Emerson =

American physician, artist, and author (1844–1930)

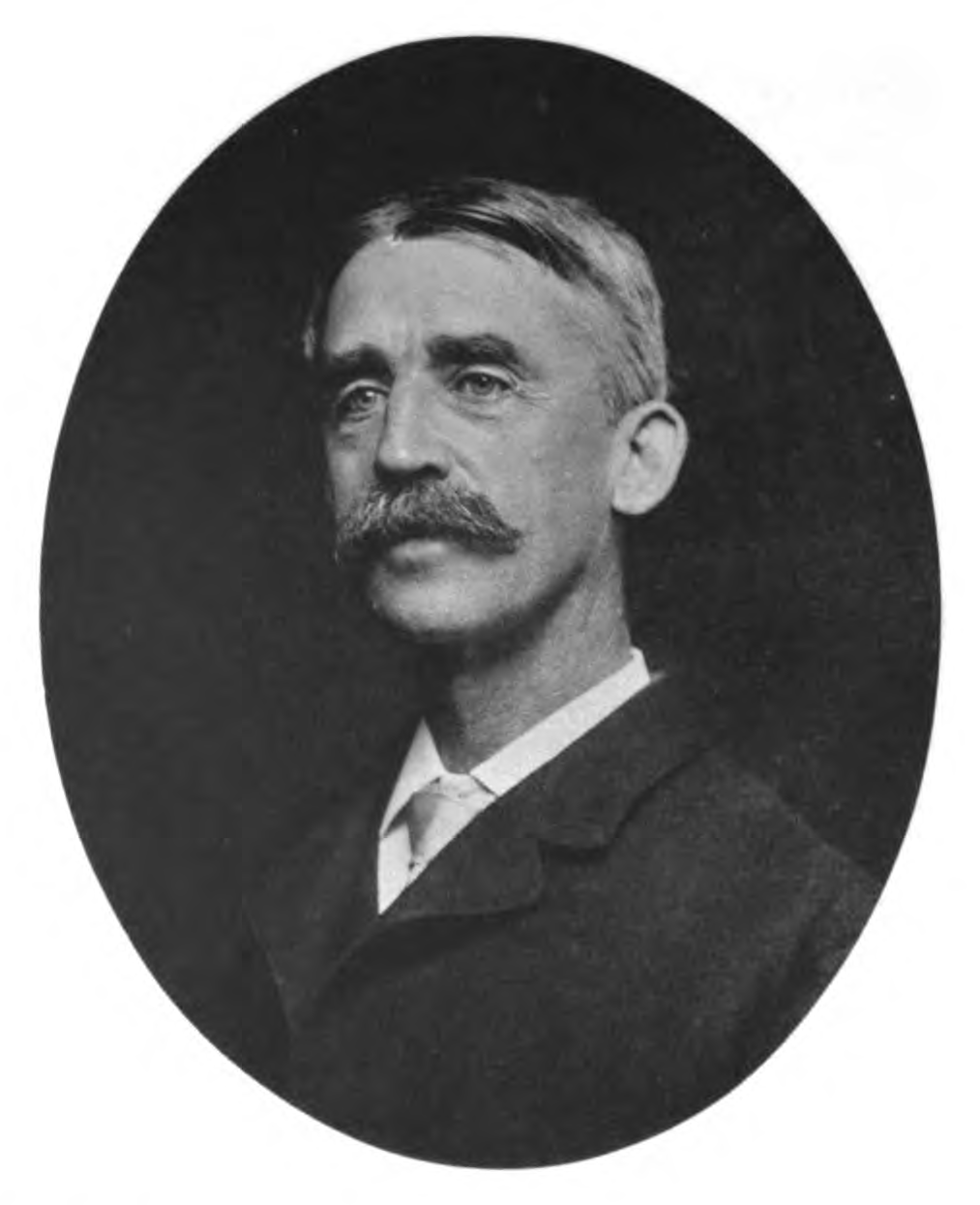
- Born: Edward Waldo Emerson; July 10, 1844; Concord, Massachusetts, US
- Died: January 27, 1930 (aged 85); Concord, Massachusetts, US
- Resting place: Sleepy Hollow Cemetery, Concord, Massachusetts
- Education: Harvard Medical School; Harvard College
- Occupations: Physician, painter, writer, lecturer
- Spouse: Annie Shepard Keyes (m. 1874)
- Children: 4, including Raymond Emerson
- Parents: Ralph Waldo Emerson (father); Lidian Jackson Emerson (mother)

Edward Waldo Emerson (July 10, 1844 – January 27, 1930) was an American physician, painter, writer, and lecturer. The only surviving son of Ralph Waldo Emerson and Lidian Jackson Emerson, he was his parents' heir and literary executor. He held degrees from Harvard College and Harvard Medical School, taught at the School of the Museum of Fine Arts in Boston, and wrote or edited a number of books.

== Early life and education ==
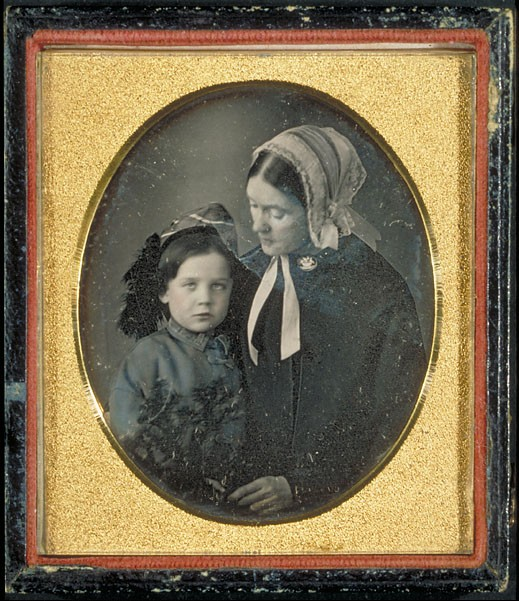
Daguerreotype depicting Edward Waldo Emerson as a child with mother Lidian Jackson Emerson, 1850

Emerson was born on July 10, 1844, in Concord, Massachusetts, the youngest child of eminent New England intellectuals Ralph Waldo Emerson and Lidian Jackson Emerson and their only son who survived to adulthood. Edward Waldo lived almost his entire life in his hometown of Concord. In childhood, he befriended Henry David Thoreau and attended Franklin B. Sanborn’s progressive private school in Concord.

Rejected for Union army service because of his ill health, which also forced him to take a yearlong leave of absence from college, Emerson received his bachelor's degree from Harvard College in 1866. He worked for the Chicago, Burlington and Quincy Railroad in Burlington, Iowa, but once again became ill and returned home to Massachusetts. After a short period working in the Quincy vineyard of his brother-in-law William Hathaway Forbes, Emerson decided to study medicine. After a year studying abroad in Berlin and London, he received his medical degree from Harvard Medical School in 1874.

== Career ==
Following graduation, Emerson practiced medicine in Concord, commencing his career as an assistant to Dr. Josiah Bartlett and eventually taking over Dr. Bartlett's practice. However, in 1882 he inherited his father's estate and retired from his practice.

Active in public life, Emerson served as Concord's superintendent of schools and on the board of health and the cemetery and library committees. He was a founding member of the Concord Antiquarian Society and a member of the Social Circle. In 1889 he joined the Saturday Club, an informal social club of Boston intellectuals. In 1917 he became a fellow of the American Academy of Arts and Sciences. In addition, Emerson lectured widely on a host of topics and devoted considerable time and effort to organizing and editing his father's papers and manuscripts, securing Ralph Waldo Emerson's legacy.

Emerson studied with Frederic Crowninshield in the Berkshires and William Lamb Picknell in Ipswich, becoming an accomplished painter. He took his easel to Mount Monadnock in New Hampshire, Naushon Island in southeastern Massachusetts, Moret-sur-Loing and Antibes in France, and Devon and London in England. He served as an instructor in anatomical art at the School of the Museum of Fine Arts for more than 20 years, from 1885 to 1906. In 1896, the J. Eastman Chase Gallery in Boston's Back Bay neighborhood publicly exhibited his pictures and sketches. A skilled equestrian, he often featured horses in his paintings.

== Personal life ==
On September 19, 1874, Emerson married Annie Shepard Keyes (1847–1928), daughter of John Shepard Keyes and Martha Lawrence (Prescott) Keyes. Only four of the couple's seven children lived to adulthood, and only one child survived them.

The Emerson children who survived to adulthood were the following:

- Ellen Tucker Emerson (1880–1921), who married Charles Milton Davenport in 1920
- Florence Emerson (1882–1906), who married Gerrit Forbes
- William Forbes Emerson (1884–1906)
- Raymond Emerson (1886–1977), who married Amelia Forbes in 1913

Emerson died in Concord on January 27, 1930, at the age of 85. He was buried at Sleepy Hollow Cemetery in Concord.

== Family tree ==
Joseph Emerson
William Emerson Sr.
William Emerson	Ruth Haskins
Ralph Waldo Emerson	Lidian Jackson Emerson
Edward Waldo Emerson	John Malcolm Forbes
Raymond Emerson	Amelia Forbes

== Works ==
Emerson wrote the following books:

- Emerson in Concord: A Memoir (1888)
- The Life of E. R. Hoar, with Moorfield Storey (1911)
- Thoreau: As remembered by a young friend. (1917)
- Early years of the Saturday Club, 1855–1870. Boston: Houghton Mifflin, 1918.
- Later years of the Saturday Club, 1870–1920. Boston: Houghton Mifflin, 1927.

He edited the following books:

- Correspondence of John Sterling and Ralph Waldo Emerson (1897)
- Centenary Edition of Ralph Waldo Emerson, annotated (1903)
- Life and Letters of General Charles Russell Lowell (1907)
- Emerson's Journals, with Waldo Emerson Forbes (1909)

He also made many contributions to magazines.
