= Henry J. Hosmer =

American politician and businessman (1832–1902)

Henry Joseph Hosmer
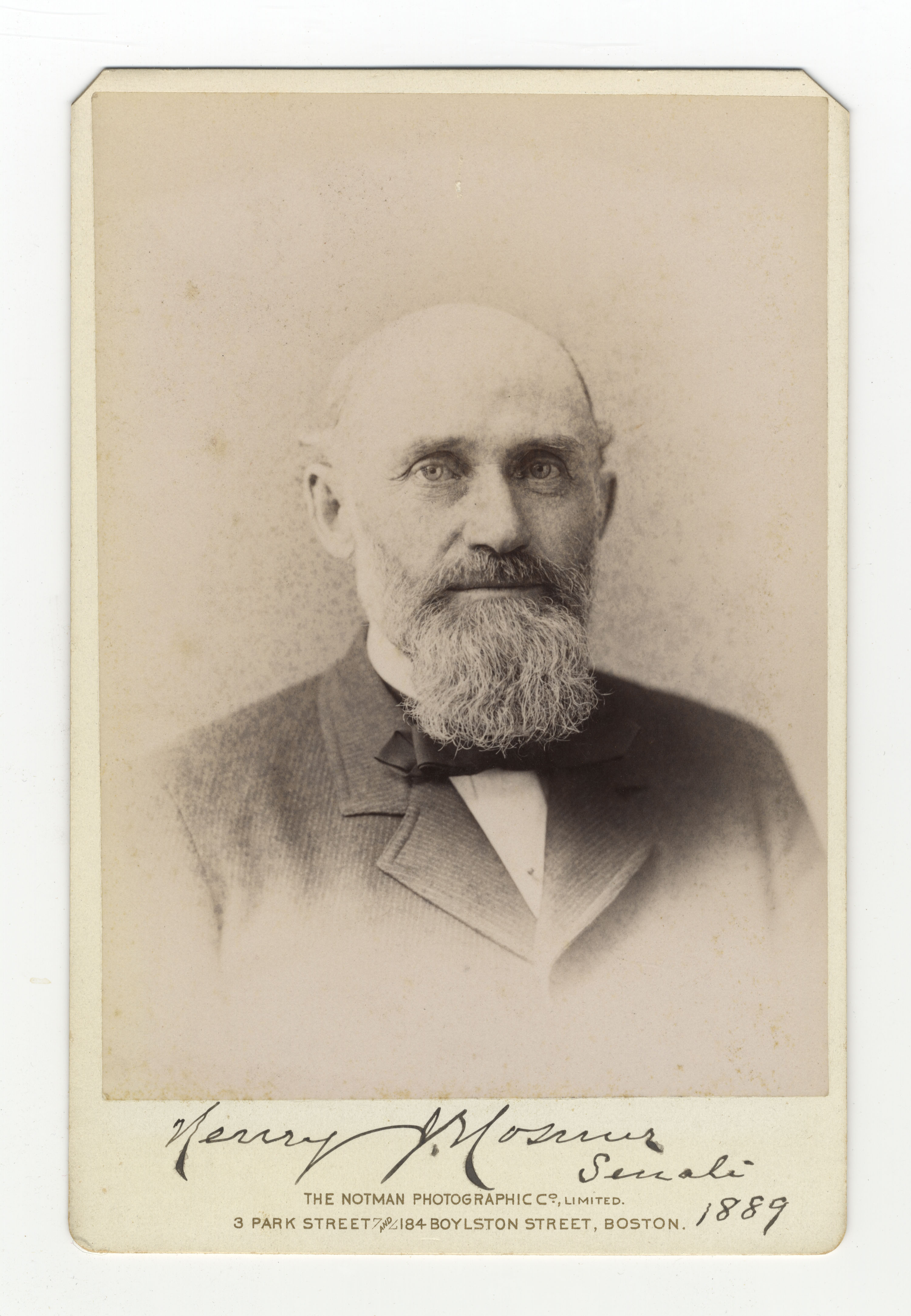
- Hosmer in 1889

Member of the Massachusetts House of Representatives
- In office 1884–1887

Member of the Massachusetts Senate
- In office 1889–1890

Personal details
- Born: February 2, 1832 Northfield, Massachusetts, US
- Died: November 14, 1902 (aged 70) Concord, Massachusetts, US
- Resting place: Sleepy Hollow Cemetery
- Party: Republican
- Occupation: Politician, businessman

Henry Joseph Hosmer (February 2, 1832 – November 14, 1902) was an American politician and businessman from Concord, Massachusetts. As a Republican, Hosmer represented Middlesex County in the Massachusetts House of Representatives from 1884 to 1887 and subsequently in the Massachusetts Senate from 1889 to 1890.

== Life and career ==
Hosmer was born on February 2, 1832, in Northfield, Massachusetts, where his parents, Cyrus Hosmer and Lydia Parkman (Wheeler) Hosmer, ran an academy for 20 years. Through his father, Hosmer was descended from one of Concord's first English settlers, James Hosmer (1605–1685), and as such he was a member of the prominent Hosmer family. On December 3, 1874, Hosmer married Laura Alan Ballou Whiting (1833–1896), a widow with a young daughter, Florence Danforth Whiting (1862–1940). Florence befriended Louisa May Alcott and kept a journal that has received scholarly attention. The Hosmers had one son, Henry Joseph Hosmer Jr. (1876–1911). Hosmer Sr. died, evidently of a sudden heart attack, at his home in Concord on November 14, 1902, at the age of 70. He was buried at Sleepy Hollow Cemetery in Concord.

In addition to his service as a Republican state senator and representative in the Massachusetts General Court, Hosmer held numerous Concord town offices, serving as a member of the select board and the water and sewer commission and as a founding member of the Trustees of Town Donations, which stewarded private gifts to the town. In the private sector, he served as treasurer of the Middlesex Savings Institute (1893–1899) and as a director of the Concord National Bank (1881–1898). He worked as president, treasurer, and general manager of the American Powder Company, a gunpowder manufacturing concern based in Acton, Massachusetts.

Hosmer's papers, including materials he collected on Hosmer family history, are held in the William Munroe Special Collections at the Concord Free Public Library.
