= Ezra Ripley =

American minister (1751–1841)

Reverend Ezra Ripley
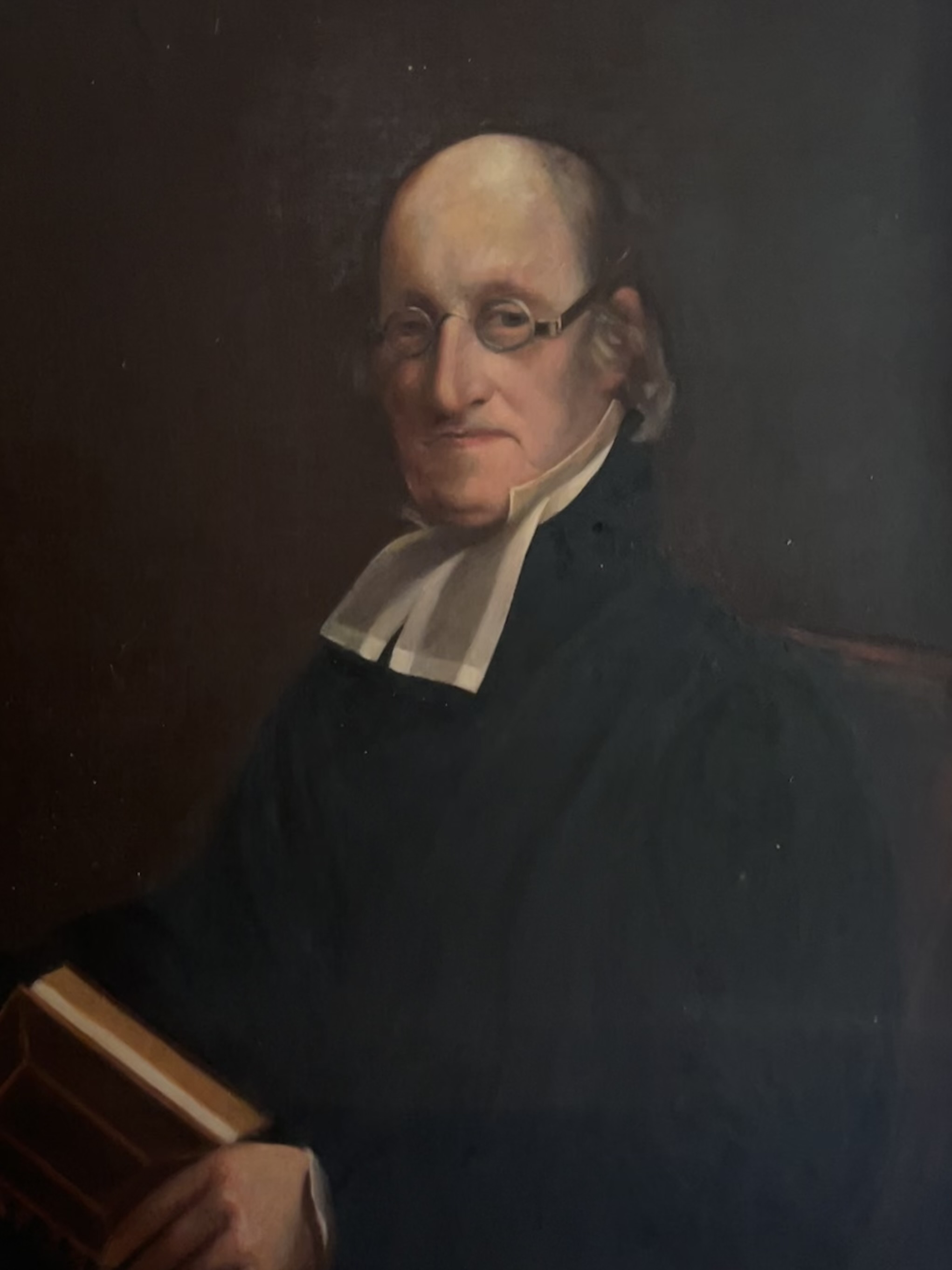
- Ripley c. 1830
- Born: May 1, 1751; Woodstock, Connecticut
- Died: September 21, 1841 (aged 90); Concord, Massachusetts
- Occupation: Minister

Ezra Ripley (May 1, 1751 – September 21, 1841) was an American minister of Concord's First Parish Church.

== Biography ==
Ripley graduated from Harvard in 1776 where he taught and subsequently studied theology. In 1778 he was ordained to the ministry in Concord, Massachusetts, where he continued for 63 years, preaching his last sermon the day after his 90th birthday. Harvard gave him the degree of D.D. in 1818. Ripley was a leader in the temperance movement.

At the time Ripley settled in Concord the town was divided into two religious factions, but he quickly succeeded in binding them in a union that existed for nearly 50 years. During this period, Ripley was the only minister in town. In 1780, he married Phebe Emerson, the widow of his predecessor, the reverend William Emerson Sr. William’s grandson, Ralph Waldo Emerson, later said of Ripley:

With a limited acquaintance with books, his knowledge was an external experience, an Indian wisdom. In him perished more personal and local anecdote of Concord and its vicinity than is possessed by any survivor, and in his constitutional leaning to their religion he was one of the rear-guard of the great camp and army of the Puritans.

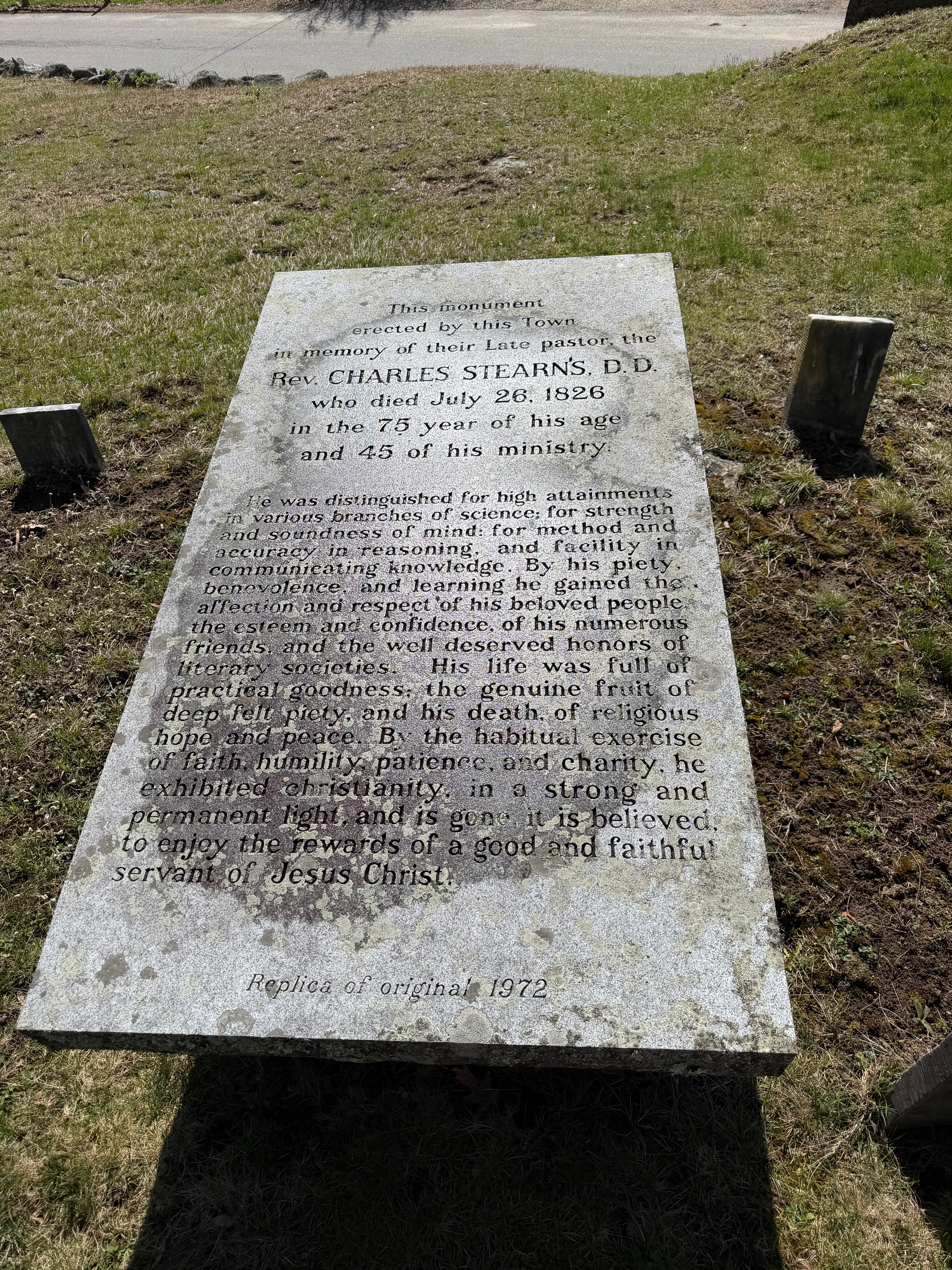
Ripley wrote the epitaph of his friend, Reverend Charles Stearns

Ripley took up residence in the Old Manse in Concord. In 1836, he gave land for the use of installing a monument to commemorate the battle of Concord, which had been fought on April 19, 1775. For 50 years after the American Revolution there was a controversy between Concord and Lexington for the honor of “making the first forcible resistance to British aggression.” Ripley wrote a pamphlet on that subject, entitled a History of the Fight at Concord, in which he argued that, though the British had fired first in the battle of Lexington early in the morning of April 19, 1775, the Americans fired first at the North Bridge in Concord later that morning (1827). Ripley was not present at either battle, and the consensus among historians (for example John Galvin, U.S. Army general and former Supreme Allied Commander of NATO forces) concluded that there is neither conclusive evidence nor agreement about which side fired first in either battle.

Ripley also published several sermons and addresses, and a Half-Century Discourse (1828).

In 1826, Ripley wrote the epitaph of his friend, Lincoln's Congregational minister Charles Stearns.

Ripley died in 1841, aged 90. He was interred in Old Hill Burying Ground in Concord. He had survived his wife by sixteen years and was buried beside her.
