= Sleepy Hollow Cemetery (Concord, Massachusetts) =

Historic cemetery in the United States

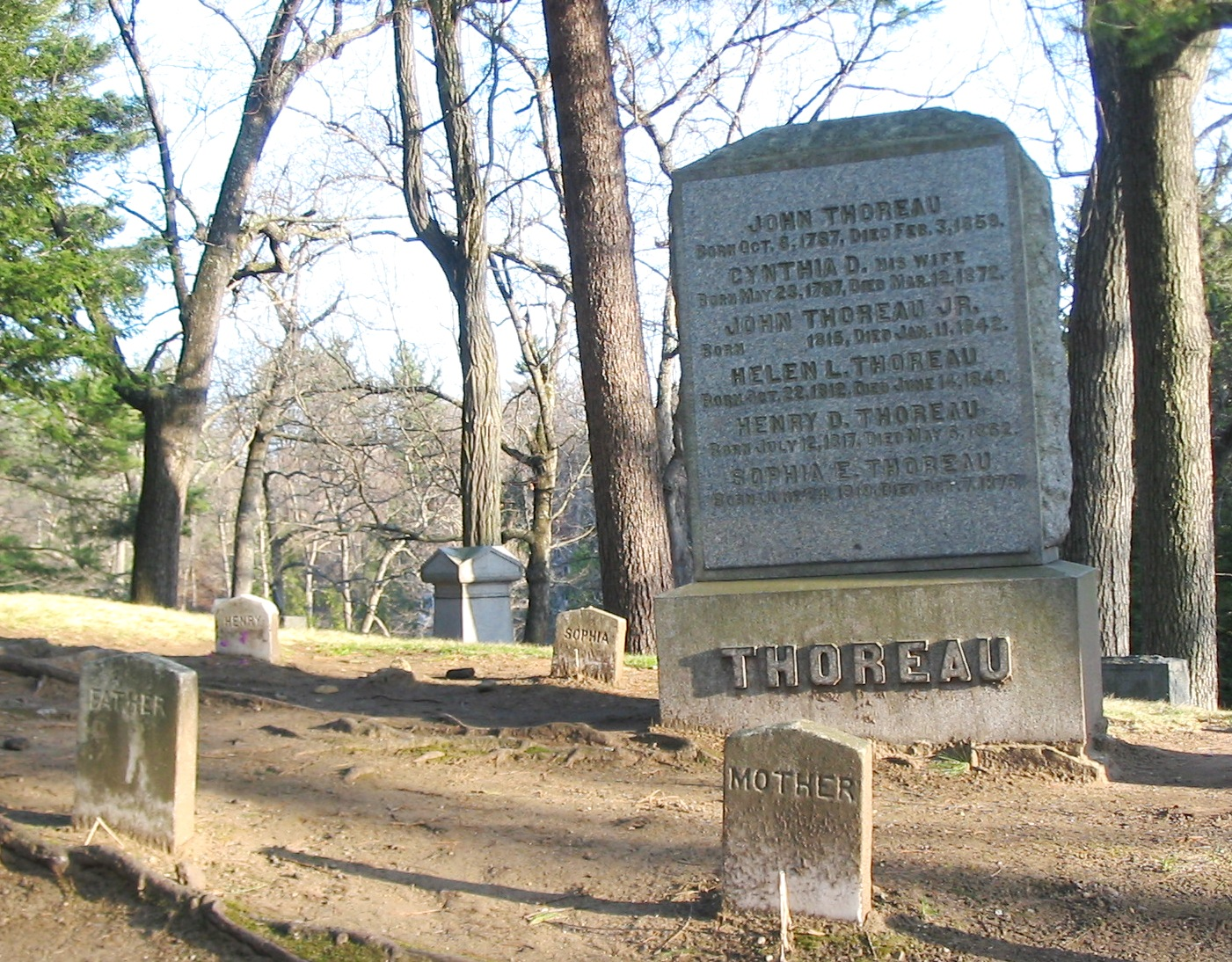
- Thoreau family plot in Sleepy Hollow Cemetery
- Interactive map of Sleepy Hollow Cemetery

Details
- Established: 1855
- Location: 34A Bedford St., Concord, Massachusetts
- Country: United States
- Type: Public
- Size: 31.6 acres (12.8 ha)
- Website: https://www.concordma.gov/1956/Sleepy-Hollow-Cemetery
- Find a Grave: Sleepy Hollow Cemetery
- Sleepy Hollow Cemetery
- U.S. National Register of Historic Places
- U.S. Historic district
- Location within Massachusetts Location within the United States
- Coordinates: 42°27′50″N 71°20′38″W
- Built: 1823
- Architect: Cleveland, Horace W.S.; et al.
- NRHP reference No.: 98000991
- Added to NRHP: August 19, 1998

Sleepy Hollow Cemetery is a rural cemetery located on Bedford Street near the center of Concord, Massachusetts. The cemetery is the burial site of a number of famous Concordians, including some of the United States' greatest authors and thinkers, especially on a hill known as "Author's Ridge."

== History ==
Sleepy Hollow was designed in 1855 by noted landscape architects Cleveland and Copeland, and has been in use ever since. It was dedicated on September 29, 1855; Ralph Waldo Emerson gave a dedication speech and would be buried there decades later. Both designers of the cemetery had decades-long friendships with many leaders of the Transcendentalism movement which is reflected in their design.

"Sleepy Hollow was an early natural garden designed in keeping with Emerson's aesthetic principles," writes Joachim Wolschke-Bulmahn in his Nature and Ideology. In 1855, landscape designer Robert Morris Copeland delivered an address he entitled The Usefull [sic] and The Beautiful, tying his principles of naturalistic, organic garden design to Emerson's Transcendentalist principles. Shortly afterward, Copeland and his partner were retained by the Concord Cemetery Committee, of which Emerson was an active member, to design a cemetery for the growing community.

On September 29, 1855, Emerson delivered the opening address of the cemetery's consecration. In it he lauded the designers' work. "The garden of the living," said Emerson, was as much for the benefit for the living, to communicate their relationship to the natural world, as it was to honor the dead. By situating the monuments to the dead within a natural landscape, the architects conveyed their message, said Emerson. A cemetery could not "jealously guard a few atoms under immense marbles, selfishly and impossibly sequestering [them] from the vast circulations of nature [which] recompenses for new life [each decomposing] particle."

Known as Sleepy Hollow for some 20 years prior to its use as a cemetery, Emerson told his audience at the consecration ceremony that September day in Concord, "When these acorns, that are falling at our feet, are oaks overshadowing our children in a remote century, this mute green bank will be full of history: the good, the wise, and the great will have left their names and virtues on the trees... will have made the air tuneable and articulate."

To realize their vision, Emerson noted that the cemetery's designers had fitted the walks and drives into the site's natural amphitheater. They also left much of the original natural vegetation in place, instead of removing it and replanting with ornamental shrubs, as was often the case. Several years after Emerson's address, a visitor to the new cemetery noted the abundance of wild plants such as woodbine, raspberry, and goldenrod, as well as the natural moss and roots of pine trees which were left in situ by the designers.

The Melvin Memorial, also known as Mourning Victory, sculpted by Daniel Chester French marks the grave of three brothers killed in the Civil War.

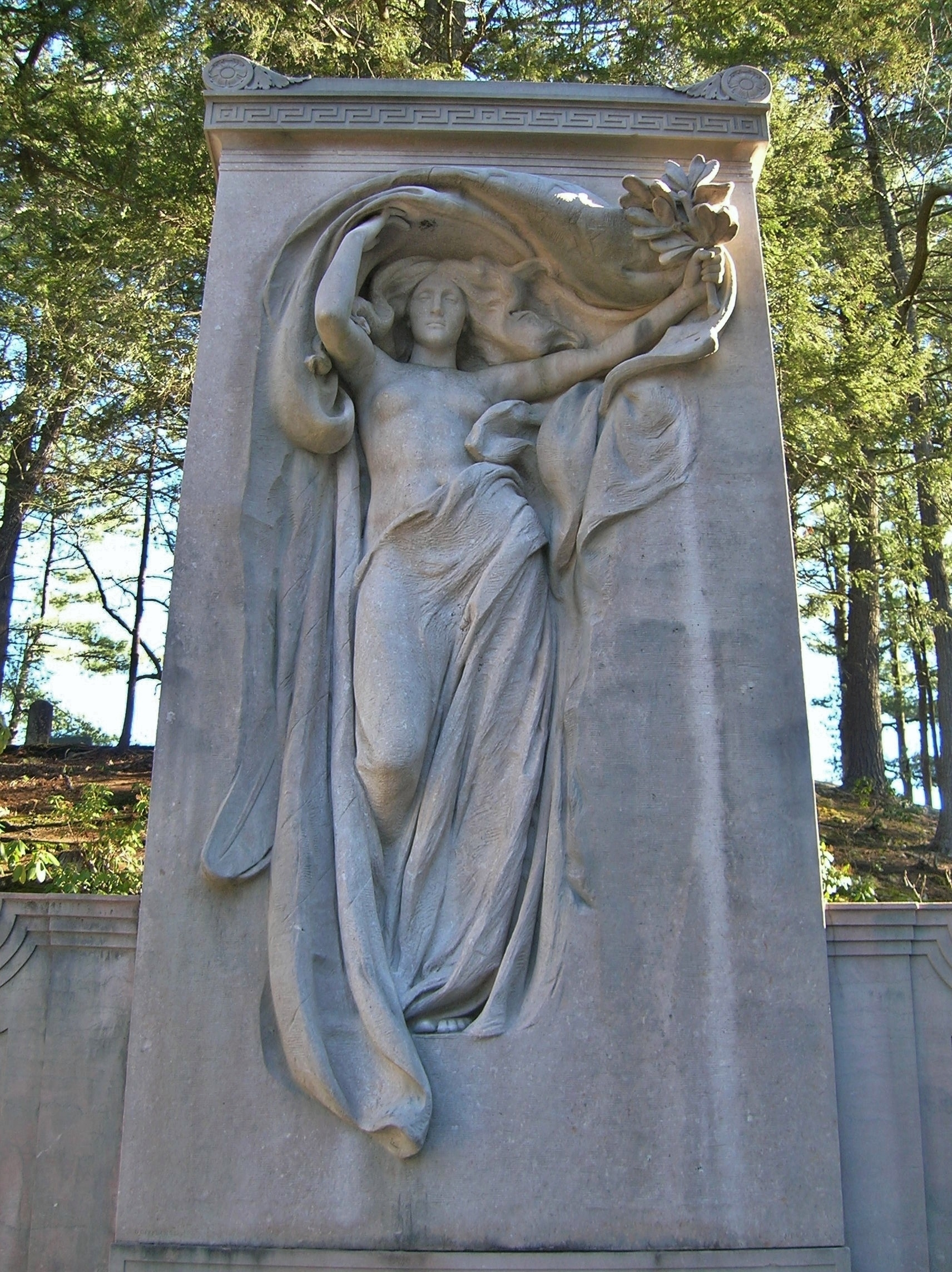
Melvin Memorial (1908) (Daniel Chester French, sculptor; Henry Bacon, architect)

Several notable literary figures are buried on "Author's Ridge".

People are still being buried in Sleepy Hollow. The back of the newer portion of the cemetery leads to a path system which connects to the Great Meadows National Wildlife Refuge.

== Notable burials ==
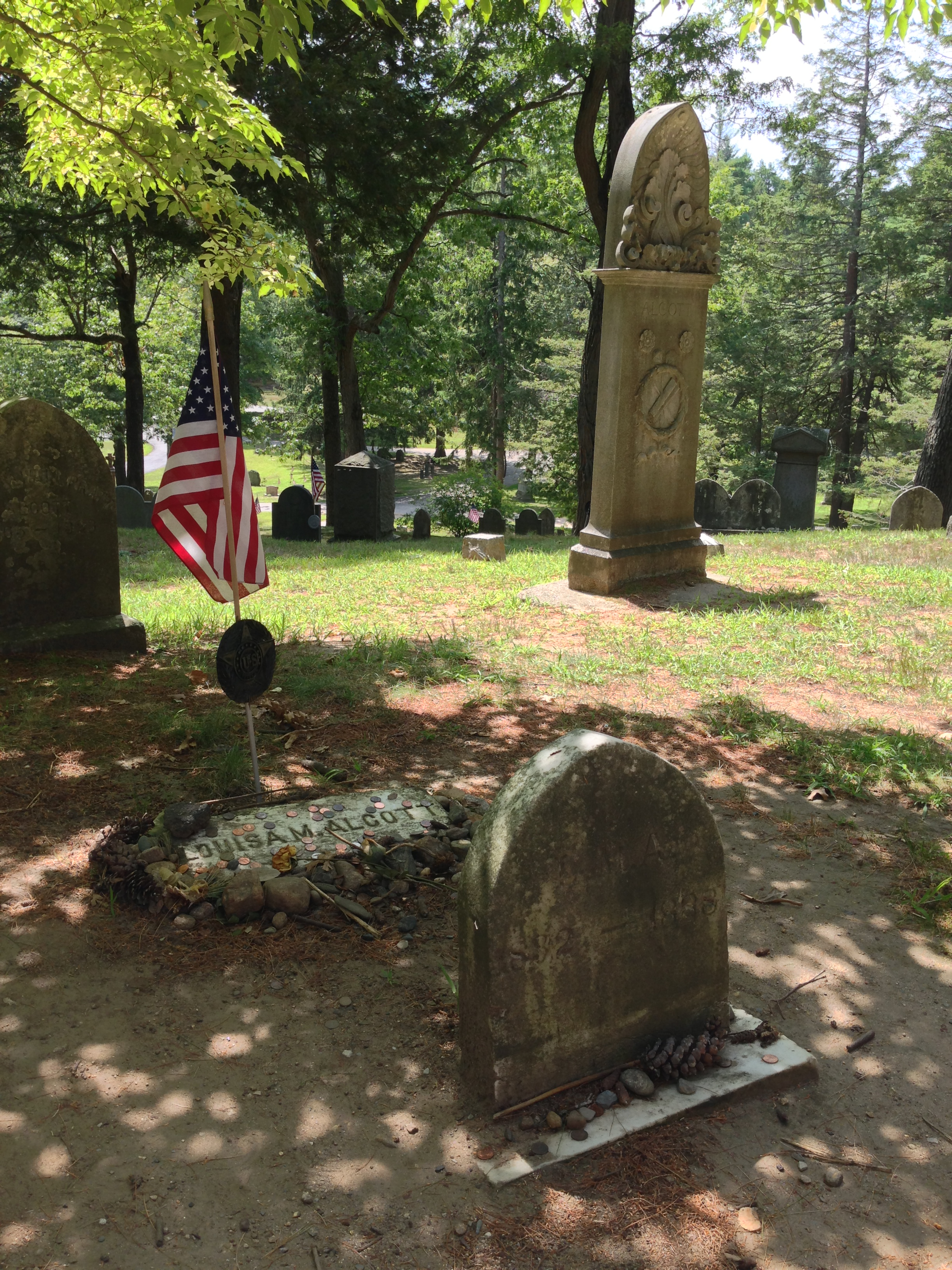
The grave of Louisa May Alcott at Sleepy Hollow

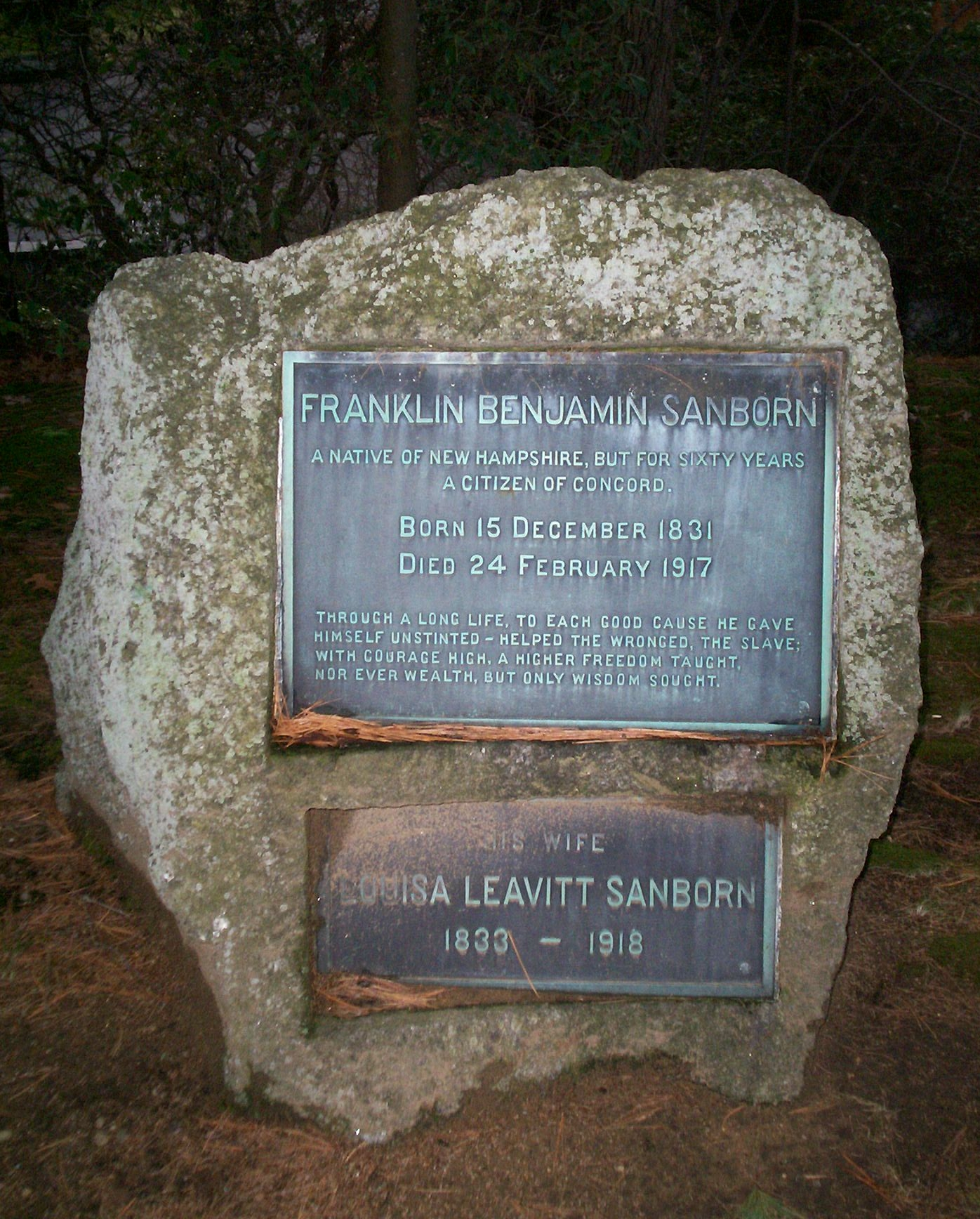
The grave of Franklin Benjamin Sanborn at Sleepy Hollow

- The Alcott family, including Amos Bronson Alcott (Transcendentalist, philosopher, educator), his wife Abby May (social worker, abolitionist), and 3 of their daughters: Anna Alcott Pratt, Louisa May Alcott (author of Little Women and others) and Elizabeth Sewall Alcott as well as Anna's husband John Bridge Pratt and their sons, John Sewall Alcott Pratt and Frederick Alcott Pratt with their spouses and Frederick's children
- Charles A.P. Bartlett (WWI Army captain and Pennsylvania State Senator)
- Ephraim Wales Bull (creator of the Concord Grape)
- William Ellery Channing (Transcendentalist and poet)
- James Underwood Crockett (gardener and host of The Victory Garden)
- Marc Daniels (pioneer television director of I Love Lucy and the original Star Trek series)
- Katherine Kennicott Davis (composer of "The Little Drummer Boy")
- Edward Waldo Emerson (physician, painter, and writer; son of Ralph Waldo Emerson)
- Mary Moody Emerson (diarist and letter writer; aunt of Ralph Waldo Emerson)
- Ralph Waldo Emerson (American Transcendentalist, essayist, lecturer, and poet)

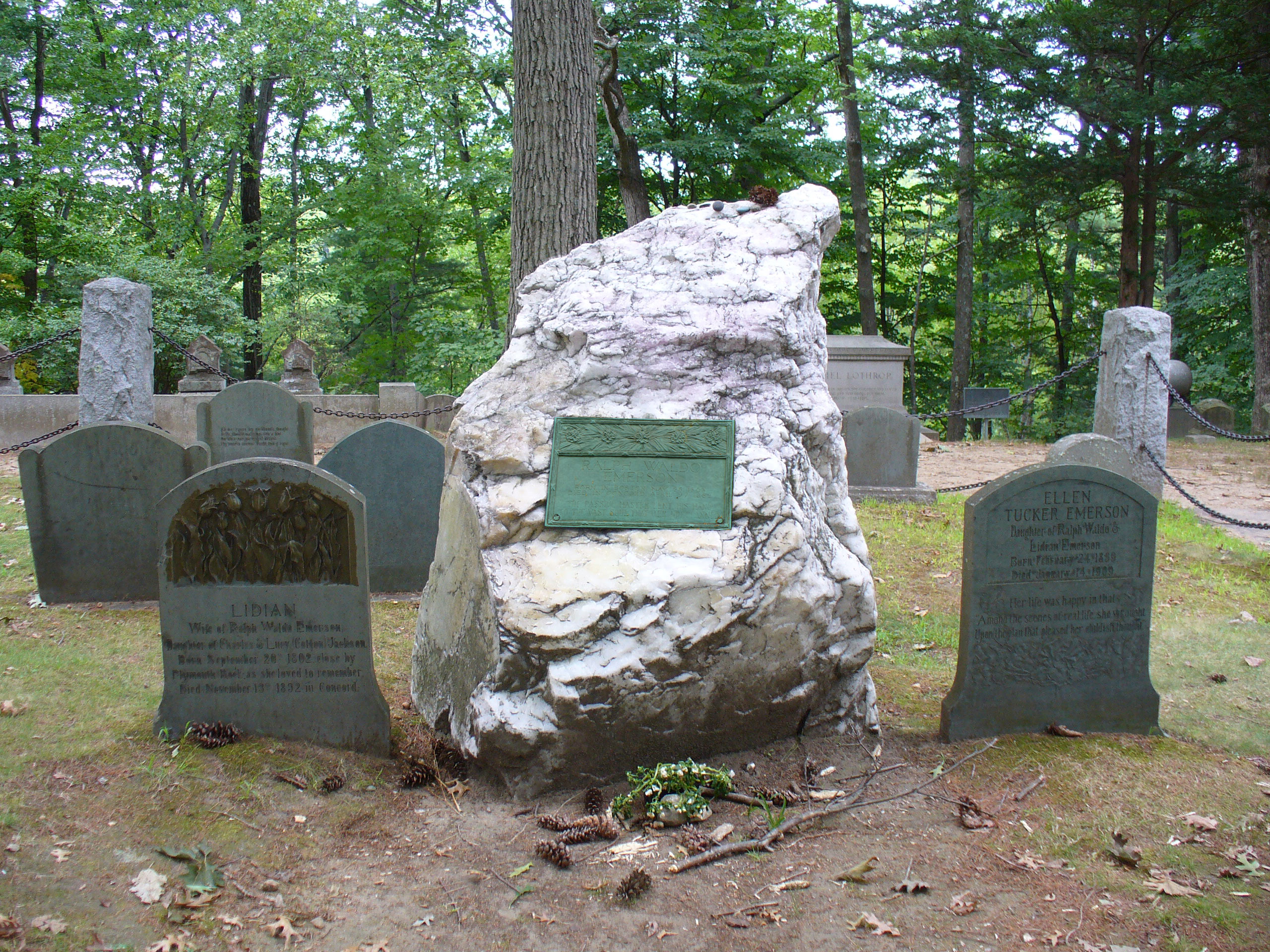
Ralph Waldo Emerson's grave in Sleepy Hollow Cemetery

- Daniel Chester French (sculptor of the Lincoln Memorial)
- Nathaniel Hawthorne (author of The Scarlet Letter and others)
- Sophia Hawthorne (American painter and illustrator)
- Frederick Heyliger (Officer with Easy Company, 2nd Battalion, 506th Parachute Infantry Regiment, 101st Airborne Division)
- Ebenezer R. Hoar (19th-century politician)
- George Frisbie Hoar (19th-century politician)
- George Washington Hosmer (Unitarian minister and President of Antioch College)
- Henry J. Hosmer (19th-century politician and American Powder Company executive)
- Ralph Hosmer (first territorial forester of Hawaii)
- Edward Holton James (socialist)
- Harriett M. Lothrop (founder of Children of the American Revolution, author of children's books, widow of publisher Daniel Lothrop, friend of Julia Ward Howe and the Alcott family)
- Richard Marius (Reformation historian and Southern novelist)
- Robin Moore (author of The Green Berets, The French Connection and other books)
- Ralph Munroe (yacht designer and pioneer of South Florida)
- Elizabeth Peabody (education reformer)
- Franklin Benjamin Sanborn (author and social reformer)
- Harriette Lucy Robinson Shattuck (author, writer on parliamentary law, suffragist)
- Henry David Thoreau (American Transcendentalist, philosopher, essayist, and lecturer) The family plot includes his parents, brother John Jr., and sisters Helen Thoreau and Sophia Thoreau.
- Mary Lemist Titcomb (founder of the Bookmobile)
- Mary Colman Wheeler (founder of the Wheeler School)
- George Washington Wright (California's first representative in Congress)

== See also ==
- List of United States cemeteries
- National Register of Historic Places listings in Concord, Massachusetts
