= Lidian Jackson Emerson =

American writer and academic

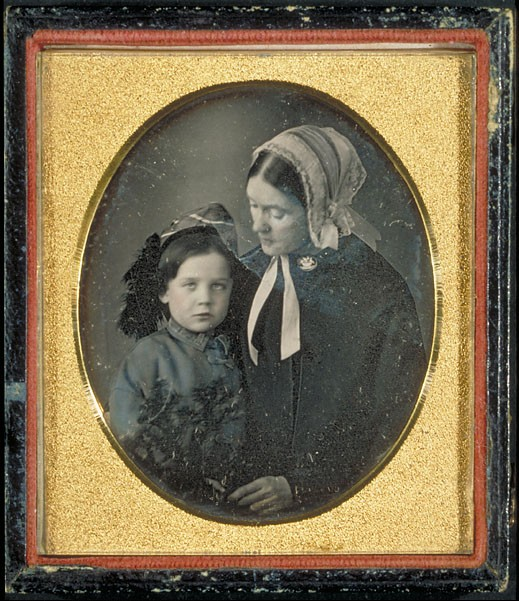
- Lidian Emerson with Edward Waldo Emerson
- Born: Lydia Jackson; September 20, 1802; Plymouth, Massachusetts, U.S.
- Died: November 13, 1892 (aged 90); Concord, Massachusetts, U.S.
- Resting place: Concord, Massachusetts
- Spouse: Ralph Waldo Emerson (m. 1835; died 1882)
- Children: Waldo Emerson; Ellen Emerson; Edith Emerson Forbes; Edward Waldo Emerson

Lidian Jackson Emerson (born Lydia Jackson; September 20, 1802 – November 13, 1892) was the second wife of American essayist, lecturer, poet and leader of the nineteenth century Transcendentalism movement, Ralph Waldo Emerson, and mother of his four children. An intellectual, she was involved in many social issues of her day, advocating for the abolition of slavery, the rights of women and of Native Americans and the welfare of animals, and campaigned for her famous husband to take a public stand on the causes in which she believed.

== Biography ==
=== Early life ===
She was born as Lydia Jackson, the fifth child of Charles Jackson and Lucy Jackson (née Cotton). She was raised in austerity; by the time she was orphaned at sixteen, two of her siblings had also died, and Lydia was sent to live with relatives. At age 19 she developed scarlet fever, which was judged the source of her lifelong poor health. Her head was said to be "hot ever after." Chronic digestive problems, coupled with gastric and epigastric pain, discouraged her from eating, to the point that she became quite thin. She dosed herself with calomel, a commonly used mercury-containing preparation now known to damage health. The terror of her childhood haunted her all her life.

=== Marriage ===
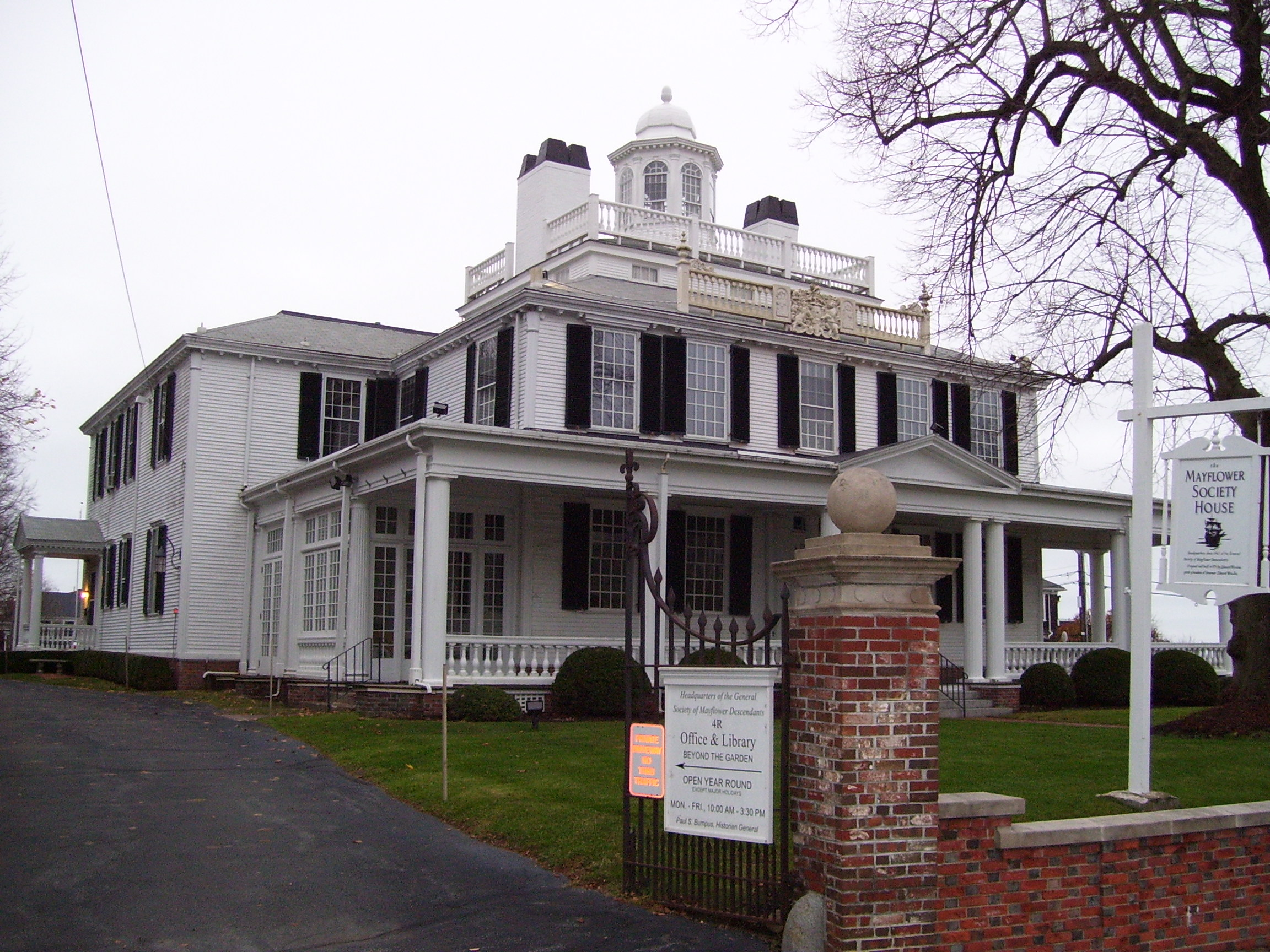
Mayflower House Museum in Plymouth, Massachusetts: the girlhood home of Lidian Emerson

In 1834, Lydia Jackson heard Ralph Waldo Emerson give a lecture in her town of Plymouth, Massachusetts and was "so lifted to higher thoughts" that she had to hurry home before those thoughts could be tainted with everyday things. She attended another lecture and a social gathering afterward, where she was able to speak with Mr. Emerson. She was inclined toward belief in omens and believed to herself to have experienced two pre-cognitive episodes, in which she saw herself married to Emerson although they had met only once. A letter from Emerson containing a marriage proposal arrived soon after Lydia's vision of his face, looking into her eyes. Although content, at age thirty-two, with the life of a spinster-aunt who tended a garden and kept chickens, Lydia Jackson accepted Ralph Waldo Emerson's proposal.

The couple were married on September 14, 1835, in the parlor of the Jackson family home overlooking Plymouth Harbor. The house, known as the Edward Winslow House, is now the headquarters of The Mayflower Society.

Newlyweds Lydia and Ralph Waldo Emerson settled immediately in Concord, in a large white house they named "Bush". It was here Lydia Emerson would play hostess to a continual stream of dinner and overnight guests throughout the years of her marriage.

Emerson immediately began calling his wife "Lidian" rather than Lydia, possibly to avoid her name being pronounced "Lidiar" as would be common in New England. In his book, Emerson Among the Eccentrics, Carlos Baker suggests the possibility Emerson made the change because "something in his quiet association with her recalled to his memory" lines from L'Allegro by John Milton:

And ever, against eating cares,
Lap me in soft Lydian airs,
Married to immortal verse
Such as the meeting soul may pierce...

However, Lydia and her friends continued to refer to her as Lydia. On the other hand, Lidian always referred to her husband as "Mr. Emerson", reflecting "New England reserve" rather than lack of affection. Lydia Jackson's name is "Lidian" on her tombstone in Sleepy Hollow Cemetery.

=== Motherhood ===
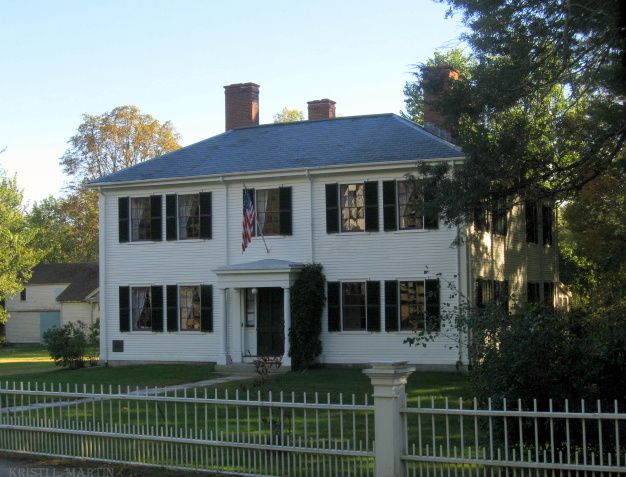
Emerson Family Home in Concord

Lidian's frequent bouts of illness and chronic fatigue were exacerbated during pregnancy, when it was difficult for her to take proper nourishment due to gastric upset. Nevertheless, the Emersons had four children.

1. Waldo, born October 30, 1836, succumbed to scarlet fever at age five, a loss from which Lidian never recovered.
2. Eldest daughter Ellen Tucker Emerson, born February 24, 1839, was named for the first wife of Ralph Waldo Emerson at Lidian's suggestion. She remained unmarried and proved to be a great help to her father in his work. She wrote a biography of her mother and lived to the age of sixty-nine.
3. Edith Emerson, born November 22, 1841, married William Hathaway Forbes, son of John Murray Forbes, bore him eight children, and lived to be eighty-seven.
4. Edward Waldo Emerson, born July 10, 1844, became a medical doctor and, upon his death at eighty-five, had outlived all but one of his seven children.

=== Friendships ===
A friendship developed between Lidian Emerson and Henry David Thoreau, who roomed with the Emersons, assisting with household maintenance and guiding the Emerson children. When Emerson went abroad in 1847, Thoreau wrote him that "Lidian and I make very good housekeepers. She is a very dear sister to me."

The little garden which was being planted with fruit-trees and vegetables, with Mrs. Emerson's tulips and roses from Plymouth at the upper end, needed more care and much more skill to plant and cultivate than the owner had; who, moreover, could only spare a few morning hours to the work. So Thoreau took it in charge for his friend. He dealt also with the chickens, defeating their raids on the garden by asking Mrs. Emerson to make some shoes of thin morocco to stop their scratching."

=== Death ===
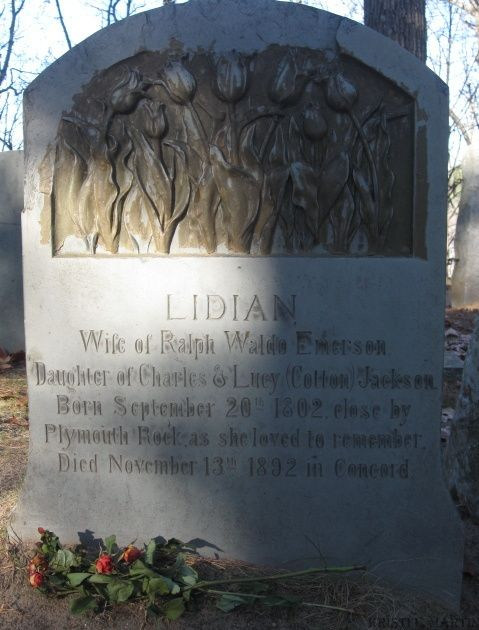
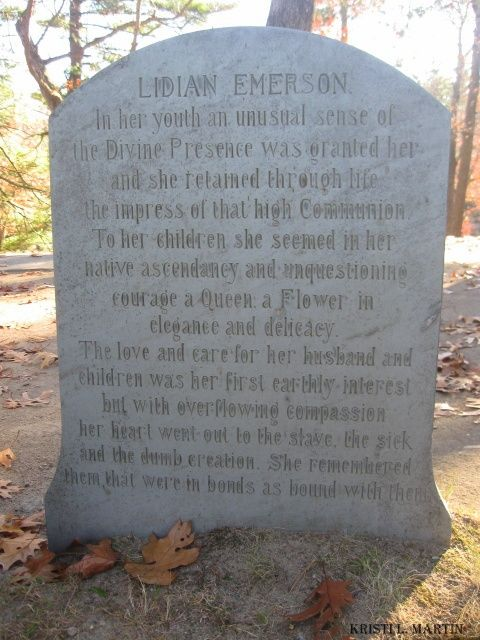
Gravestone of Lidian Jackson Emerson in Sleepy Hollow Cemetery

In mid-November, 1892, Ellen Emerson reported that her mother was breathing heavily, as though she had a cold.

Before we went to bed Miss Leavitt was seriously alarmed. I asked Mother if I should read to her. She asked what. I said father's letters to Mr. Carlyle, and she said, By all means. I read and she slept. At about seven I tried to give her some hot milk from the sprout-cup. She said, I can't. The rattling in her throat stopped, she opened her eyes, I saw she was dying for they were dead. At 7:35 I think she breathed her last. I sent for Miss Leavitt, who smoothed her hair. Edward was a wise and skillful hand, and a great comfort.

Lidian Emerson had outlived her husband by more than ten years, and was buried beside him in Sleepy Hollow Cemetery, Concord, on Author's Ridge.

== Beliefs ==
In his own autobiography, Franklin Benjamin Sanborn describes Emerson's aunt, Mary Moody Emerson, greeting the new Mrs. Emerson with, "You know, dear, that we think you are among us, but not of us." Years later, Ellen Emerson would explain that her mother always felt her home to be Plymouth; Lidian Jackson Emerson never fully engaged in the life of Concord, and never fully shared her husband's philosophy, which came into conflict with the strict orthodoxy of an upbringing into which the circumstances of her life would cause her to retreat. Sanborn would opine that "Mrs. Emerson held a position in religion midway between the gloomy, fading Calvinism of Mary Emerson, and the intuitive, ideal Theism of her nephew."

== Significance ==
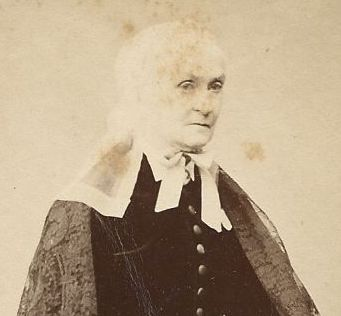
Lidian Jackson Emerson in old age

Near the end of his own life, Frank Sanborn described Mrs. Emerson as "a stately, devoted, independent person", with "the air... of a lady abbess, relieved of the care of her cloister, and given up to her garden, her reforms, and her unceasing hospitalities."

In Ellen Emerson's biography of her mother, she states that as time went on, "More and more tributes to her charms kept coming to my ears," including statements that Mr. Emerson might have been a different man, had Lidian not been his wife, and that "she is quite as wonderful as he."
