= Mary Moody Emerson =

American writer (1774–1863)

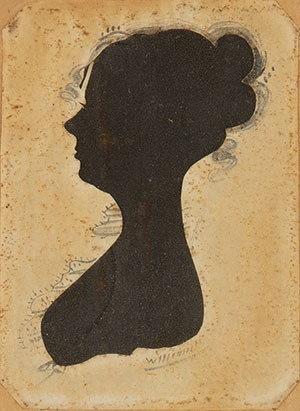
- Born: August 23, 1774; Concord, Massachusetts, U.S.
- Died: May 1, 1863 (aged 88); Concord, Massachusetts
- Burial place: Sleepy Hollow Cemetery (Concord, Massachusetts)
- Occupation: Writer
- Relatives: William Emerson (father); Ralph Waldo Emerson (nephew)

Mary Moody Emerson (August 23, 1774 – May 1, 1863) was an American letter writer and diarist. She was known not only as her nephew Ralph Waldo Emerson's "earliest and best teacher", but also as a "spirited and original genius in her own right". Ralph Waldo Emerson considered her presence in his life a “blessing which nothing else in education could supply”; and her vast body of writing—her thousands of letters and journal entries spanning more than fifty years—"became one of Emerson's most important books". Her surviving documents reveal the voice of a "woman who […] had something to say to her contemporaries and who can continue to speak to ours" about "the great truths that were the object of her life's pilgrimage".

== Biography ==
=== Early life ===
Born in Concord, Massachusetts, in 1774, Mary Moody Emerson was the fourth child of Phebe Bliss and the Reverend William Emerson. Both the Emerson and the Bliss family forebears came to Massachusetts with the first generation of Puritan settlers in the 1630s, and both families' histories deeply involved religious ministry. Ever since Mary's great-great-grandfather Joseph Emerson settled in Concord, at least one son in each succeeding generation was ordained a minister of the church. Included in this “ministerial dynasty” was Mary's great uncle Joseph Moody, who appeared before his congregation with a handkerchief covering his face—the inspiration for the protagonist in Nathaniel Hawthorne's story "The Minister's Black Veil". Many of the Emerson men attended Harvard, and the family was generally respected and genteel though not wealthy, integrally involved in the New England Calvinist milieu.

In 1776, after suffering the loss of her father to "army-fever", two-year-old Mary was sent out of Concord to live in Malden, Massachusetts, with her grandmother, who was in poor health, and her aunt Ruth, who suffered from insanity. This marked the beginning of what Mary Emerson later called a time of "chaos and deprivation". Separated from her mother and siblings, reared with little social interaction and meager formal education, she wrote that her life in Malden was a "slavery of poverty & ignorance & long orphanship […and] lonesome solitude". The family was so impoverished that they very often subsisted on a "bread-and-water diet" and would send the young Mary to keep watch for the debt-collecting sheriff. Mary's journal entries suggest that living in "calamitous poverty" and isolation as a youth profoundly affected her entire life. She wrote many years later, "Oh I could give facts of the long drawn years of imprisoned minds & hearts w'h uneducated orphans endure[d]".

=== Education ===
As Emerson revealed in an 1869 lecture dedicated to his aunt, starting in her youth, Mary Emerson developed an ethic of individualism and found meaning in labor and self-education. She explained in a journal entry, "I am so small in my expectations, that a week of industry delights. Rose before light every morn; visited from necessity once, and again for books; read Butler's Analogy; commented on the Scriptures; read in a little book,—Cicero's letters,—a few: touched Shakespeare,—washed, carded, cleaned house, and baked. To-day cannot recall an error, nor scarcely a sacrifice, but more fulness of content in the labors of a day never was felt". The kind of person who never seemed to rest, she "sp[un] with a greater velocity than any of the other tops [,…] would tear into the chaise or out of it, into the house or out of it, into the conversation, into the thought, into the character of the stranger".

Though burdened with innumerable daily chores including the care of an infirm grandmother and an insane aunt, Mary Emerson found time to read voraciously. Her early reading included the Bible, the English poets Milton, Young, and a few others, and the religious writers Samuel Clarke and Jonathan Edwards. As a young woman, she would read Plato, Plotinus, Marcus Aurelius, Shakespeare, Coleridge, Wordsworth, Cousin, Locke, Mme. De Stael, Channing, Byron, Spinoza, Rousseau, Eichhorn, Goethe, among numerous others. Her education (through books, lectures, correspondence, sermons, and conversation) was completely self-directed—an "insatiate roaming after metaphysics and illuminati", according to her nephew Charles. Denied the Harvard education available to her brother and other male relatives both past and present, Mary Emerson made the seeking of personal truth and knowledge a central concern in her life. Ralph Waldo Emerson later stated that she, like he, was of the "Sect of the Seekers". Unlike the formally educated male Emersons, Mary sought knowledge, as she wrote in her journal, “without any of the bridges”.

=== Adult life ===
Mary Moody Emerson lived in Malden until 1791, when she moved to her sister Hannah's home in Newburyport to help care for that family's ten children. She felt optimistic at this point in her life and declared that leaving her situation in Malden was an "awful moment wh divide[d] the polluted past from the spotless, the tremendous future". After Newburyport, the seventeen-year-old Mary began a sort of occupation as an on-call nanny and nurse for various relatives which was to provide her room and board and keep her busy and moving around New England for many years. In his 1869 lecture, Emerson praised his aunt's "good will to serve in time of sickness or of pressure", but one of his aunt's journal entries conveyed a sense of weariness with her role as constant care-giver: "Oh how quietly […] did I use in early years to pass from Mother to Aunt from Sister to Sister for all was without mentality & to keep souls & bodies together".

Although Mary Moody Emerson had thus "given her youth to old people and her meridian to children", her lifestyle seemed a conscious and deliberate choice. She was offered one proposal of marriage, but rebuffed it, writing, "Henceforth the picture I'll image shall be girded loins, a bright lamp, fervent devotion". She wrote that she "never expected connections and matrimony", claiming, "I scarcely feel the sympathies of this life enough to agitate the pool". "Doubt[ing] the advantage of marriage in a woman's life", Mary eschewed her expected role as wife and mother, instead choosing "[r]eading, writing, and conversing [as] her vocations".

In 1809, Mary Emerson invested her modest inheritance from her Aunt Ruth (who died in 1808) in a 150-acre farm close to the White Mountains near Waterford, Maine, which she called Elm Vale. A rustic, secluded farmhouse surrounded by lakes, streams, and "noble forests", Elm Vale would become Mary Emerson's sanctuary. Here, as her friend Elizabeth Hoar remarked, Mary "wrote and read, and enjoyed poetic and spiritual raptures, in comparative seclusion". Though she owned the farm (along with her sister Rebecca and brother-in-law Robert Haskins) for almost forty years, financial issues demanded that she live there only sporadically. Mortgage obligations, disputes over the property, and her own intermittent desire for new stimulation prompted Mary to spend long periods—from months to years—visiting, boarding, and working as care-giver elsewhere. Although she seemed to enjoy the intellectual and physical stimulation of traveling, proclaiming, "I had rather live a wandering life & die a beggar,…than drag down to active littleness", Mary Emerson missed her farm when away and wrote often of "pitifully […] saying good-bye" when departing.

=== Mary Emerson and young Ralph Waldo Emerson ===
In 1811, when Waldo was eight years old, Mary Moody Emerson's older brother—the Reverend William Emerson—died, and again she assisted her family in a time of need. She left Elm Vale and moved to Concord to live with William's widow Ruth, helping care for Ruth's six young children and working to support the boarding house that became an important source of family income. Here, Mary and her nephews developed close bonds (her one niece, Mary Caroline, lived only three years). William, Ralph Waldo, Edward, Robert (who was intellectually disabled), and especially the youngest boy Charles came to consider their Aunt Mary a surrogate father, since she helped generate income, took charge of their spiritual as well as intellectual education, and pushed them to excel. Ralph Waldo Emerson expressed that his aunt "gave high counsels" and that it "was the privilege of certain boys to have this immeasurably high standard indicated to their childhood; a blessing which nothing else in education could supply". And Ruth Emerson wrote, "I do not think her place could be supplied to these fatherless children by anyone on earth".

Mary Emerson lived with her brother's family periodically for seven years and would play a significant role in the lives of her nephews her entire life. She instilled in them her habit of daily journal writing and continual reading for self-education. She encouraged them to read poetry, delight in nature, and take risks, commanding, "[S]corn trifles, lift your aims: do what you are afraid to do". Ultimately, however, she seemed to grow weary of the domestic sphere, feeling that the endless, tiresome work "defeated [her] pursuit of knowledge." She wrote, "Another day is done' of activity so intense that every nerve throbs, yet the gloom of these little painful labors could not be shook off. Though the boys "pulled at Mary's genuine affection", by 1817 the forty-three-year-old Mary felt that it was time for her to leave and return to Elm Vale.

=== Religion ===
Mary Moody Emerson considered herself a lifelong orphan and adopted faith as surrogate parent, writing, "Decrees—predestination—place—purpose by whatever name I love thee […]—the faith has been my father mother prized house". She was reared by family members who believed in the New Light (or neo-Calvinist) tenets propagated by Jonathan Edwards during the eighteenth-century Great Awakening. Familiar with the sermons of her New Light forebears Reverend Samuel Moody and Reverend Joseph Emerson, young Mary accepted, as her grandfather Joseph preached, "that there is a Heaven of unconceivable Glory above, and a Hell of unutterable Torment below". Instead of terrifying her, however, Mary Emerson's ancestral religion provided her comfort and hope. Growing up destitute, separated from her immediate family, isolated from society, she embraced her misery as the will of God. She "valued her own despair because it assured her of the existence of God [….] Hers was the paradoxical spirit of Calvinism that found in the darkest despair the […] presumption of holiness, that embraced rejection and turned it into an identification with Eternity". She wrote, "I rose,—I felt I had given to God more perhaps than an angel could,—had promised Him in youth that to be a blot on this fair world, at His command, would be acceptable. Constantly offer myself to continue to obscurest and loneliest thing ever heard of, with one proviso,—His agency. Yes, love Thee, and all Thou dost, while Thou sheddest frost and darkness on every path of mine".

Mary Moody's faith, however, eventually resisted strict classification as Calvinist. Her nephew Charles understood the complex nature of her beliefs and wrote that his aunt was "no statute-book of practical commandments, nor orderly digest of any system of philosophy, divine or human, but a Bible, miscellaneous in its parts, but one in its spirit". She called herself a "bible theist" and practiced “enthusiastic piety”. She stated, “How futile are creeds of faith & formulas of worship—the infinite stirs within—surrounds—absorbs”. She embraced her suffering as a means of attaining "the glorious prize of immortal glory", writing, "I should be willing to have limbs rot, and senses dug out, if I could perceive more of God".

Because both her reading and social circle were often theologically liberal, Mary Emerson eventually developed a faith that combined “orthodoxy with the more rational and evangelical tendencies alive in her day”. Claiming that she "danced to the musick of [her] own imajanation", she ultimately would accept neither Calvinism nor Unitarianism as her religion. For her, Calvinism proved too "coarse [and] damnatory" while Unitarianism seemed too "timid [and] easy". Furthermore, Unitarianism (the chosen faith of both her brother William Emerson and, initially, his son Ralph Waldo) lacked the rapture and "fiery depths" necessary for a sublimely personal relationship with God.

Mary Moody Emerson often found herself at odds with both her brother William and then Waldo about their religious philosophies. Despite their differences in beliefs, she encouraged her nephew to carry on the proud Emerson ministerial line, which he did by accepting a pulpit at Boston's Second Church in 1829. However, when he struggled with a serious crisis of faith that resulted in his resignation from the ministry in 1832, Mary became exasperated with him. Calling his faith a "withering Lucifer doctrine of pantheism", she wrote to his younger brother Charles: "[Waldo] is lost in the halo of his own imagination[….] It is time he should leave me".

She eventually forgave her nephew for his religious transgressions, admitting that she respected "the fidelity to his conscience" which impelled his decision to leave the church. She professed that "every sacrifice to truth and one's convictions will be amply rewarded". After all, it was she who had taught the young Waldo to resist conformity and take risks, and she who had advised him that "sublimity of character must come from sublimity of motive". Allowing finally that Ralph Waldo Emerson's heresy did not signify his assured damnation, Mary Emerson hoped that her nephew had found his own "[a]ngel who [could] best unite him to the Infinite".

=== Writing ===
Mary Moody Emerson wrote thousands of letters and journal entries, and she authored an essay on the "importance of imagination in religious life" published in The Monthly Anthology, a journal her brother William edited. In a sentiment that anticipated an important Emersonian concern, she claimed that she always interspersed daily physical labors of "the needle, the flat-iron, [and] the porridge pot", with intellectual labors "of ardent book, pen, &c". The New England locales where she wrote changed—Boston, Concord, Waltham, Waterford, Hartford, Newburyport, Ashfield, and Belfast, among other places— but she always found time, as her nephew Waldo stated, to "write, write, night & day, year after year".

Mary Emerson filled her diary, her "Almanack", with everything from detailed accounts of the quotidian to complex political, philosophical, and religious issues—in a style that Ralph Waldo Emerson considered "frolicsome" but that some found (and continue to find) sometimes difficult and obtuse. Nancy Craig Simmons, the editor of Mary Emerson's selected letters, called her style "baroque" and complained that "its exuberance often preclude[d] clarity". Her Almanack, at least, can be excused for its opacity because of its original intention as private discourse. It was an intensely personal prayer, Mary Emerson stated, from her "soul to its author". When her nephew Waldo was slow to return some of her notebooks while asking for her to send more, she wrote to him, "Catch me—soberly—I will not till you return the others. They are my home—the only images of having existed".

Although she claimed that her Almanack was an intimate "conversation with [her] chamber", a letter to herself "when unable to think", and a "portion of the history of a soul", she none-the-less allowed her nephew Waldo and certain other relatives liberal access to her notebooks. Out of all the Emersons who perused Mary's notebooks, Waldo would become the most enthralled by them. Emerson's own journals (which he began as a teenager upon her urging) were filled with transcriptions of his aunt's writing, and he later copied many hundreds of excerpts from her diary entries, letters, and remembered conversation into four "carefully paginated and indexed" notebooks totaling almost 900 pages. After a day spent reading and copying his aunt's writing, Emerson claimed that all the education and learning in the world would never enable a person "to anticipate one thought or expression" of hers—her style and ideas were that "new, subtle, frolicsome, […and] unpredictable".

=== Ralph Waldo Emerson and his aunt's writing ===
"How rich the world is!" Ralph Waldo Emerson proclaimed in his journal after reading a letter from his aunt Mary Moody Emerson in 1839. He continued: "I say the same when I hear a new verse of a new poet. I said the same when I walked about the Atheneum Gallery the other day & saw these pictures […] painted by God knows who,—obscure nameless persons yet with such skill & mastery". As a young man he hailed her as his "Muse"; he thought her prose "purely original" and "rich & profound & efficient in thought & emotion"; he referred to her as the best writer in Massachusetts; and he even borrowed images, ideas, subjects, and full sentences from her writing and used them in his verse, essays, lectures, and sermons.

Ralph Waldo Emerson had trouble defining the potency of his aunt's writing and finally acknowledged that it was "inimitable, unattainable by talent, as if caught from some dream". He wondered whether his life would ever be "long enough to study out the tendency & idea which subterraneously shines, sparkles, & glows in [her] sybilline leaves". Here is one sample Almanack excerpt not only copied by Emerson into his own journal but also quoted in his lecture dedicated to Mary:

We exist in eternity. Dissolve the body and the night is gone, the stars are extinguished, and we measure duration by the number of our thoughts, by the activity of reason, the discovery of truths, the acquirement of virtue, the approach to God. And the gray-headed god throws his shadows all around, and his slaves catch, now at this, now at that, one at the halo he throws around poetry, or pebbles, bugs, or bubbles. Sometimes they climb, sometimes creep into the meanest holes--but they are all alike in vanishing, like the shadow of a cloud.

Emerson admired and praised the natural spontaneity and wildness of his aunt's prose, writing in an 1841 journal entry, "What liberal, joyful architecture, liberal & manifold as the vegetation from the earth's bosom, or the creations of frost work on the window! Nothing can excel the freedom & felicity of her letters,—such nobility is in this self rule, this absence of all reference to style or standard: it is the march of the mountain winds, the waving of flowers, or the flight of birds".

In his biography of Ralph Waldo Emerson, Robert D. Richardson claims that Mary Emerson's writing has been "shamefully ignored", for her influence on her nephew's thought and writing was immense. Because of Mary's "presence and example, [Emerson] was pushed onward by her undrownable spirit, which was perpetually reaching farther up the beach than the last wave of language had taken it".

=== Death ===
According to her nephew Waldo, for some years Mary Emerson slept in a coffin-shaped bed and regularly wore death-shrouds as outfits, replacing them with newer shrouds as they wore out and death "refus[ed] to come". Images of death and death-longing filled her writing and emerged as one of her most significant and striking tropes. Emerson acknowledged this, stating that "Destitution and Death" were the "Muse[s] of her genius". She reflected, "The humblest example of meekness will shine in light when the meteors are gone [….] Good night. Oh for that 'long and moonless night' to shadow my dust, tho' I have nothing to leave but my carcase to fatten the earth—it is for my own sake I long to go".

In 1863, at almost ninety years old, Mary Emerson at last found her "moonless night". Buried at Sleepy Hollow Cemetery in Concord, Massachusetts, Mary's body—her "tedious tabernacle"—was finally placed into a "cool, sweet grave", freeing her soul to ascend to Heaven. Worms, those "most valuable companions", finally would "gnaw[…] away the meshes" that had trapped her soul on earth, a place where she felt she never truly belonged. Although she wrote in her journal, "I am resigned to being nothing, never expect a palm, a laurel, hereafter", since her death she has achieved a sort of secular transcendence among certain academics, scholars, and historians as a notable nineteenth-century American figure.

== Works ==
- The Selected Letters of Mary Moody Emerson. Nancy Craig Simmons (ed.) Athens, GA: University of Georgia Press, 1993.

== Footnotes ==
=== Sources ===
- Barish, Evelyn. "Emerson and the Angel of Midnight: The Legacy of Mary Moody Emerson," in Ruth Perry and Martina Brownley (eds.), Mothering the Mind: Twelve Studies of Writers and Their Silent Partners. New York: Holmes and Meier, 1984.
- Cole, Phyllis. "The Advantage of Loneliness: Mary Moody Emerson's Almanacks, 1802-1855." Emerson: Prospect and Retrospect. Ed. Joel Porte. Cambridge: Harvard University Press, 1982.
- Cole, Phyllis. Mary Moody Emerson and the Origins of Transcendentalism. New York: Oxford University Press, 1998. ISBN 0-19-503949-1
- Cole, Phyllis. “'Men and Women Conversing': The Emersons in 1837.” Emersonian Circles: Essays in Honor of Joel Myerson. Eds. Wesley Mott and Robert Burkholder. Rochester, NY: University of Rochester Press, 1997.
- Emerson, Ralph Waldo. Journals and Miscellaneous Notebooks of Ralph Waldo Emerson. Eds. William H. Gilman, Ralph H. Orth, et al. 16 volumes. Cambridge: Harvard University Press, 1960–1982.
- Emerson, Ralph Waldo. Lectures and Biographical Sketches. Boston and New York: Houghton, Mifflin & Co., 1883 & 1904.
- Kittelstrom, Amy. The Religion of Democracy: Seven Liberals and the American Moral Tradition. New York: Penguin, 2015.
- Richardson, Robert D. Jr. Ralph Waldo Emerson: The Mind on Fire. Berkeley: University of California Press, 1995.
- Williams, David R. Wilderness Lost: The Religious Origins of the American Mind. Selinsgrove: Susquehanna University Press, 1987.
- Williams, David R. “The Wilderness Rapture of Mary Moody Emerson: One Calvinist Link to Transcendentalism.” Studies in the American Renaissance (1986), pp. 1–16.
- Notable American Women: A Biographical Dictionary. Vol. 1. Cambridge: Harvard University Press, 1971.
