= Essays (Emerson) =

Collection of essays by Ralph Waldo Emerson

Ralph Waldo Emerson wrote several books of essays, commonly associated with transcendentalism and romanticism. "Essays" most commonly refers to his first two series of essays:

- Essays: First Series
- Essays: Second Series

Some of the most notable essays of these two collections are Self-Reliance, Compensation, The Over-Soul, Circles, The Poet, Experience, and Politics.

Emerson later wrote several more books of essays including Representative Men, English Traits, The Conduct of Life and Society and Solitude. Emerson's first published essay, Nature, was published in 1836, before the first and second series.
