= Henry More =

English Anglican priest and philosopher (1614–1687)

The Reverend Henry More FRS
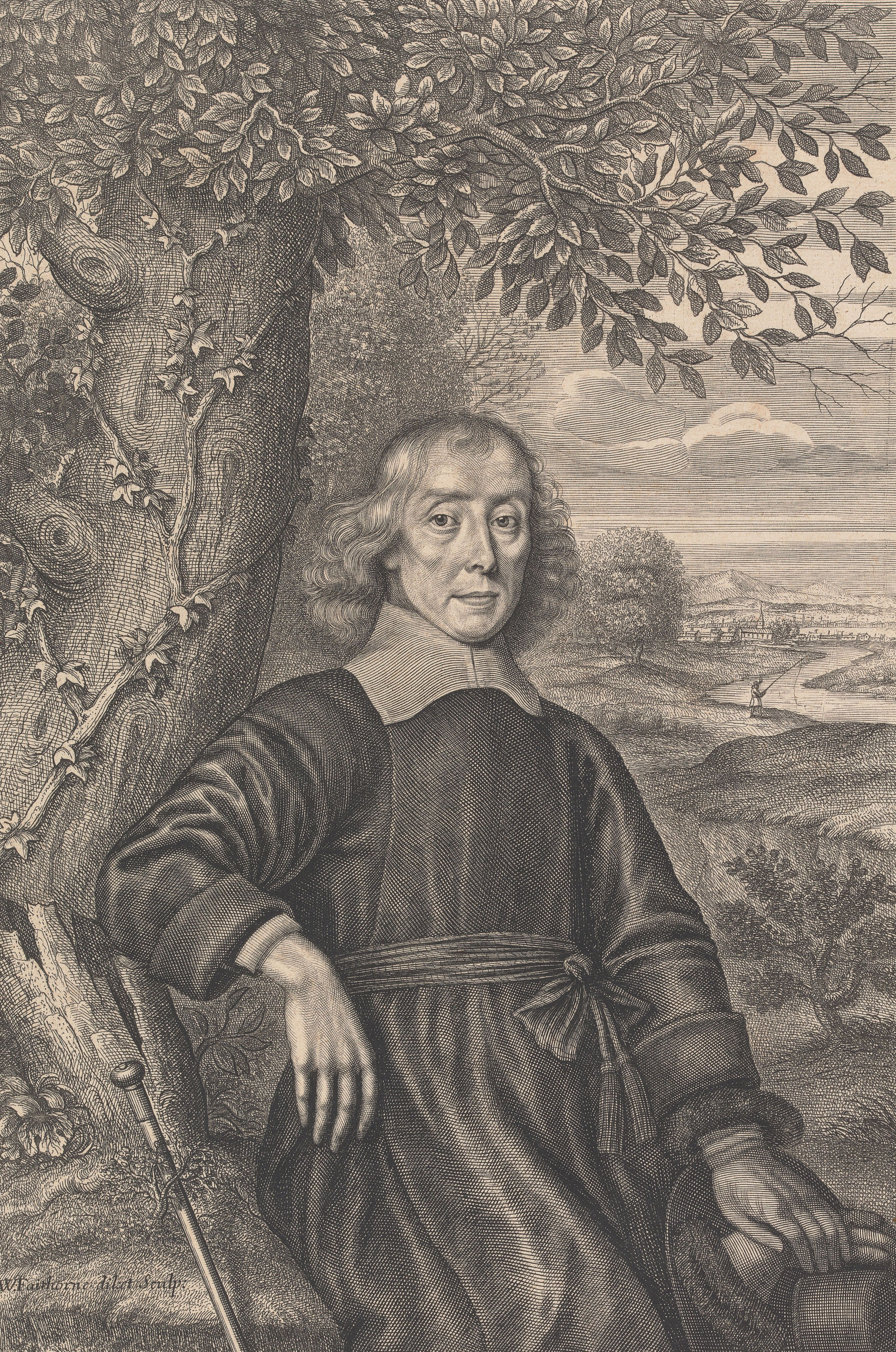
- Portrait by William Faithorne, 1675
- Born: 12 October 1614; Grantham, Lincolnshire, England
- Died: 1 September 1687 (aged 72); Cambridge, England
- Occupations: Philosopher; priest; theologian; poet

Education
- Education: Christ's College, Cambridge

Philosophical work
- Era: 17th-century philosophy
- Region: Western philosophy
- School: Cambridge Platonists
- Institutions: Christ's College, Cambridge
- Language: English, Latin
- Main interests: Metaphysics; Theology; ethics; natural philosophy
- Notable ideas: Essential spissitude, extended immaterial substance, early use of the concept of a fourth dimension, Spirit of Nature

Henry More FRS (/mɔːr/; 12 October 1614 – 1 September 1687) was an English philosopher, Anglican priest, theologian, and poet, associated with the Cambridge Platonists. He sought to reconcile Platonism with Christian theology and responded critically to Cartesian philosophy. His metaphysical writings addressed the nature of spirit, matter, divine providence, and the soul, and he was a prominent voice in seventeenth-century religious and philosophical debates.

More rejected Cartesian dualism, arguing that spirit, like matter, must be extended in space. He coined the term fourth dimension and introduced the concept of essential spissitude to describe the spatial extension of immaterial substance. He also proposed the existence of a Spirit of Nature—an unconscious, incorporeal agent through which God sustained the order of the physical world. His metaphysics grounded his opposition to materialist atheism and emphasised the necessity of immaterial principles in explaining life and motion.

He opposed the Cartesian view that animals were mere machines, asserting instead that they possess immaterial but mortal souls. More regarded animals as part of divine providence and cited their usefulness to humans as evidence of design, while acknowledging the theological difficulty posed by predation and suffering.

His writings, in both Latin and English, spanned metaphysics, ethics, natural philosophy, and theology, and included poetry and prose. He influenced figures such as Lady Anne Conway, Joseph Glanvill, and John Norris, and was later cited by Ralph Waldo Emerson and Helena Blavatsky.

== Biography ==
Henry More was born in Grantham, Lincolnshire on 12 October 1614. He was the seventh son of Alexander More, mayor of Grantham, and his wife Anne More (née Lacy). Although both parents were Calvinists, More later wrote that he "could never swallow that hard doctrine."

He was educated at The King's School, Grantham and at Eton College, before entering Christ's College, Cambridge in 1631, around the time that John Milton was departing. He received his BA in 1635 and his MA in 1639, and was shortly thereafter elected a fellow of his college, declining all other preferments. He declined the mastership of Christ's College in 1654, despite indications that he was the preferred candidate, and the position was instead offered to Ralph Cudworth. In 1675, More accepted a prebend at Gloucester Cathedral, but soon resigned it in favour of his friend Edward Fowler, who later became bishop of Gloucester.

Among More's students was Anne Finch, sister of Heneage Finch, who later became Lady Conway. At her estate at Ragley in Warwickshire, More spent a significant amount of time and composed several of his works. Lady Conway's spiritual interests influenced some of More's philosophical ideas, although she eventually joined the Quakers. She maintained friendships not only with More and William Penn, but also with figures such as Franciscus Mercurius van Helmont and Valentine Greatrakes, both associated with 17th-century mystical and thaumaturgical traditions. Ragley thus became a centre of spiritual and religious activity.

More died in Cambridge on 1 September 1687 and was buried in the chapel of Christ's College.

== Philosophy ==
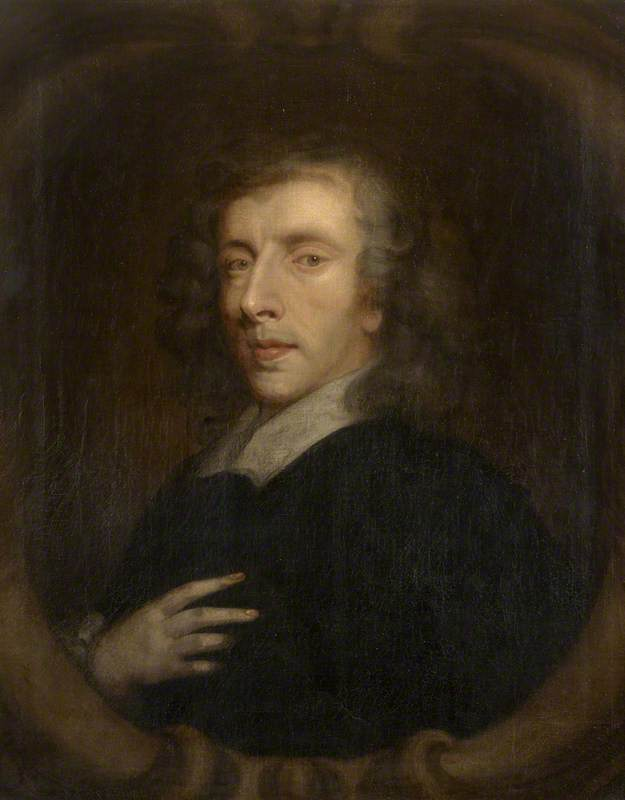
More, oil on canvas, attributed to Peter Lely

=== Theology and moral necessity ===
Henry More developed a metaphysical system influenced by Neoplatonism, while also engaging with aspects of the emerging mechanical philosophy of the seventeenth century. Although often associated with the Cambridge Platonists, his views diverged in several respects.

More rejected Calvinist predestinarianism and materialist atheism, maintaining that God was morally perfect and necessarily governed by absolute standards of goodness. He argued that moral truths were eternal and independent of divine will, in contrast to the voluntarist theology associated with Calvinism. On this basis, More held that God was obliged to create the best possible world—not for the benefit of humanity, but to manifest divine perfection.

=== Dualism and extended spirit ===
More's philosophy included a dualistic distinction between body and spirit. He described matter as inert and passive, asserting that all motion and activity must originate in immaterial spirit. He extended this principle to all living beings, maintaining that life and movement required the presence of an immaterial, self-moving soul.

Although initially receptive to Cartesian thought, More later criticised its core principles. He rejected Descartes's identification of body with extension, arguing that immaterial substances were also extended. In More's view, to exist was to exist in space; therefore, even God, souls, and angels must possess spatial extension. He defined spirit not by the absence of extension but by its penetrability and indivisibility.

More rejected Cartesian dualism on the grounds that it was, in his view, more coherent to attribute matter and extension to the soul than to ascribe to an immaterial substance the capacity to move and be moved by the body. His reservations were not based on difficulties in explaining the interaction between material and immaterial substances, but rather on a philosophical position that regarded extension as a necessary condition for existence. As he wrote, "... it is plain that if a thing be at all it must be extended." On this basis, More argued that spirit must also be extended. This led him to propose the concept of a fourth dimension (a term he is credited with coining) in which spirit possesses extension—a property he termed essential spissitude—as part of his proposed resolution to the mind–body problem.

=== Spirit of Nature ===
To account for natural phenomena he regarded as inadequately explained by mechanical laws—such as gravity, magnetism, and biological instincts—More proposed the existence of the Spirit of Nature. He described it as an incorporeal but extended substance that functioned as a secondary, unconscious cause in nature. Although distinct from God, it was considered a necessary emanation of divine power through which God maintained the order of the physical world.

=== Space, time, and metaphysics ===
More articulated a view of absolute space and time as real, immaterial entities. He described space as infinite, extended, and incorporeal, attributing to it qualities such as omnipresence and immutability. He considered space strong evidence for the reality of immaterial substance. Rejecting the Cartesian position that immaterial souls exist "nowhere" (nullibism), he maintained that all beings exist spatially. Time, likewise, was regarded as absolute and independent of perception. Both space and time were seen as emanative effects of divine presence.

More's metaphysical system presented matter as dependent on active, extended spirit. He engaged with contemporary debates in natural philosophy, theology, and metaphysics, and responded critically to aspects of Cartesianism.

=== Animals ===
Henry More rejected the Cartesian doctrine of animal automatism, maintaining instead that animals possess immaterial souls. While he denied that animal souls were immortal, he held that they were distinct from matter and capable of sensation and self-motion. This view was integral to his broader metaphysical system, which depended on a strict dualism between passive matter and active spirit. For More, denying souls to animals risked collapsing this distinction and opening the door to atheistic materialism.

More regarded animals as part of divine providence, often citing their usefulness to humans—as sources of food, labour, or companionship—as evidence of design. He also argued that even wild or dangerous animals served providential ends, such as testing human courage or contributing to the beauty and complexity of creation. However, the existence of predatory and harmful animals raised theological challenges, especially concerning the problem of evil. In response, More suggested that such creatures reflected the limitations of creation rather than flaws in the divine will.

He drew a sharp ethical and psychological line between humans and animals. While animals, in his view, pursued bodily satisfaction and exhibited instinctual behaviour, humans were uniquely capable of rational thought and moral virtue. Nonetheless, More acknowledged the presence of "animal" passions within human beings and emphasised the need to govern these impulses through reason. His reflections on the human–animal boundary, found in both his prose and poetry, served to reinforce his belief in a divinely ordered cosmos structured by gradations of soul and purpose.

== Influence ==
More is among the earliest known sources to refer to the idea that medieval Scholasticism engaged in speculative questions such as "How many angels can dance on the head of a pin?", which he described as occurring "on a needles [sic] point" in the second chapter of The Immortality of the Soul.

A quotation from More is used as the epigraph to Ralph Waldo Emerson's essay "The Over-Soul", published in Essays: First Series (1841).

Helena Blavatsky, the founder of modern Theosophy, quoted More and discussed his ideas in chapter VII of her work Isis Unveiled (1877).

== Works ==
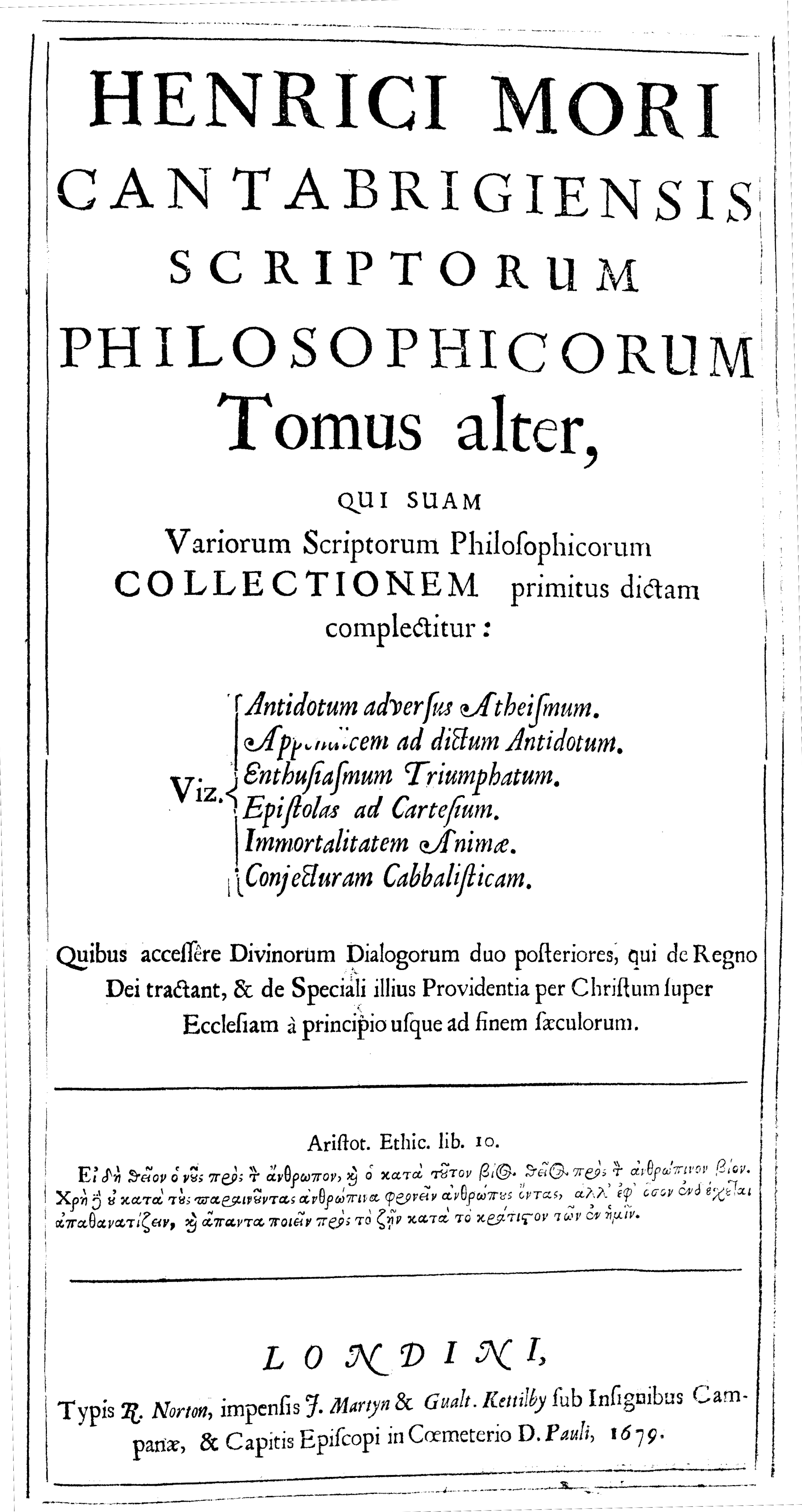
Works (Henrici Mori Cantabrigiensis Opera Omnia), 1679

More was a prolific author of both verse and prose. His Divine Dialogues (1688) presents a concise statement of his philosophical and theological views. Like many writers of his era, he began as a poet and later turned primarily to prose. His first work, written in 1640 and published in 1642, was Psychodoia Platonica: or, a Platonicall Song of the Soul, consisting of four several Poems. In 1647, he published a larger collection titled Philosophical Poems, which included an expanded version of The Song of the Soul and was dedicated to his father. A second edition appeared later that year, and the collection was reprinted by A. B. Grosart in the Chertsey Worthies Library (1878).

More's prose works include the following:

- Observations upon Anthroposophic Theomagica and Anima Magica Abscondita, by "Alazonomastix Philalethes" (a pseudonym), 1650; a critique of Thomas Vaughan, who responded with The Man-mouse Took in a Trape.
- The Second Lash of Alazonomastix, a rejoinder to Vaughan, 1651.
- An Antidote against Atheism; or, an Appeal to the Natural Faculties of the Mind of Man, whether there be not a God, 1653; 2nd edition with additions, 1655.
- Conjectura Cabbalistica ... or a Conjectural Essay of Interpreting the Mind of Moses, according to a Threefold Cabbala: viz. Literal, Philosophical, Mystical, or Divinely Moral, 1653; dedicated to Ralph Cudworth.
- Enthusiasm Triumphatus, or a Discourse of Nature, Causes, Kinds, and Cure of Enthusiasm, 1656.
- The Immortality of the Soul, so far forth as it is demonstrable from the Knowledge of Nature and the Light of Reason, 1659; dedicated to Viscount Conway.
- An Explanation of the Grand Mystery of Godliness; or, a True and Faithful Representation of the Everlasting Gospel of our Lord and Saviour Jesus Christ, 1660.
- A Modest Enquiry into the Mystery of Iniquity, with an appended Apology, 1664.
- Enchiridion Ethicum, 1667 (and later editions through 1711); a Latin ethical manual grounded in classical sources.
- Divine Dialogues: containing sundry Disquisitions and Instructions concerning the Attributes of God and His Providence in the World, 1668; the most complete edition appeared in 1713.
- An Exposition of the Seven Epistles to the Seven Churches; Together with a Brief Discourse of Idolatry, with application to the Church of Rome, 1672–1673. The second title appears in the volume as An Antidote against Idolatry, with follow-up works published in response to criticism.
- Enchiridion Metaphysicum: sive, de rebus incorporeis succincta et luculenta dissertatio; pars prima, 1671; a critique of Cartesian philosophy, which More had previously supported.
- Remarks upon two late ingenious Discourses (by Matthew Hale) on gravitation and the Torricellian experiment, 1676.
- Apocalypsis Apocalypseos; or, the Revelation of St. John the Divine Unveiled, 1680.
- A Plain and Continued Exposition of the Several Prophecies or Divine Visions of the Prophet Daniel, 1681.
- A Brief Discourse of the Real Presence of the Body and Blood of Christ in the Celebration of the Holy Eucharist, 1681.

More is also believed to have written Philosophiae Teutonicae Censura (1670), a critique of the theosophy of Jacob Boehme, and to have edited Joseph Glanvill's Saducismus Triumphatus (1681), contributing extensive commentary. He also annotated Glanvill's Lux Orientalis (1682), and maintained a correspondence with John Worthington, whose Diary preserves several of their letters. Further letters between More and John Norris appear in Norris's Theory and Regulation of Love (1688). A Collection of Several Philosophical Writings of Dr. Henry More was first published in 1662 and includes Antidote against Atheism, Enthusiasmus Triumphatus, Letters to Des Cartes, Immortality of the Soul, and Conjectura Cabbalistica; a greatly expanded fourth edition appeared in 1712.

More also published collected editions of his works, including Opera theologica (1675) and Opera philosophica (1678). Between 1672 and 1675, he translated many of his English writings into Latin. This effort began with Henrici Mori Cantabrigiensis Opera Theologica (1675), and culminated in the two-volume Henrici Mori Cantabrigiensis Opera Omnia (1679), produced with the support of John Cockshutt of the Inner Temple, who had left More a legacy of £300 to fund the translations. Later posthumous publications include Discourses on Several Texts of Scripture (1692), prefaced by John Worthington, and Letters on Several Subjects (1694), published by Edmund Elys. An abridged selection, The Theological Works of the Most Pious and Learned Henry More (1708), was produced for charitable libraries.

Primary sources on More's life include Richard Ward's Life (1710), the Prefatio Generalissima to the 1679 Opera Omnia, and an Apology published in 1664. Later assessments include John Tulloch's Rational Theology (vol. II, 1874); Johann Georg Ritter von Zimmermann's Henry More und die vierte Dimension des Raums (Vienna, 1881); and Henry More: Tercentenary Studies, edited by Sarah Hutton (Dordrecht, 1990).
