= Essay (disambiguation) =

An essay is a short piece of writing.

Essay may also refer to:

- Essay (numismatics), a prototype of a proposed coin
- Essay (philately), a prototype of a proposed stamp
- Essay, Orne, a town in France

== Literary works ==
- Essays (Montaigne), a book by Michel de Montaigne
- Essays (Francis Bacon), a book by Francis Bacon
- Essays (Emerson), several collections of essays by Ralph Waldo Emmerson, including:
  - Essays: First Series, 1841
  - Essays: Second Series, 1844

== See also ==
- EASSy (Eastern Africa Submarine Cable System), a submarine fibre optic cable system
