= Treatise (disambiguation) =

Treatises are written discourses.

Treatise or variation, may also refer to:

== Discourses ==
Classes of treatises

- Tract (literature)
- Monograph
- Essay

Types of treatises

- Learned treatise
- Legal treatise
- Military treatise
- Political treatise

== Other uses ==
- Treatise (music), a 1960s musical composition by Cornelius Cardew
- The Treatise (Walter of Bibbesworth) (Anglo-Norman: Le Tretiz), a 13th-century Anglo-Norman poem by Walter of Bibbesworth

== See also ==
- Treatise on money (disambiguation)
- Essay (disambiguation)
- Tract (disambiguation)
- Treaties
- Treaty (disambiguation)
