= Essays: Second Series =

Essays by Ralph Waldo Emerson (1844)

Essays: Second Series is a series of essays written by Ralph Waldo Emerson in 1844, concerning transcendentalism. It is the second volume of Emerson's Essays, the first being Essays: First Series. This book contains:

1. "The Poet"
2. "Experience"
3. "Character"
4. "Manners"
5. "Gifts"
6. "Nature"
7. "Politics"
8. "Nominalist and Realist"
9. "New England Reformers"

== See also ==
- Essays: First Series
- Nature
- New England Reformers
