= The Conduct of Life =

Book by Ralph Waldo Emerson

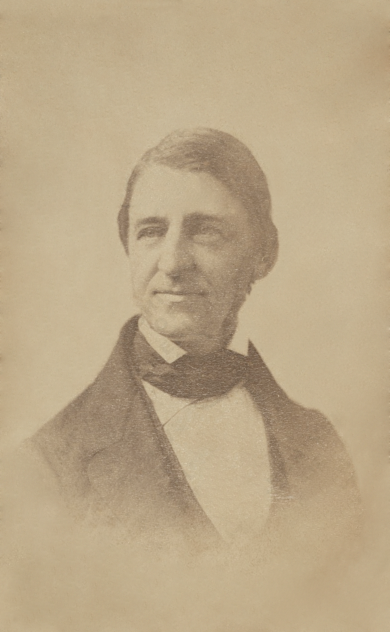
Emerson in the 1860s

The Conduct of Life is a collection of essays by Ralph Waldo Emerson published in 1860 and revised in 1876. In this volume, Emerson sets out to answer "the question of the times:" "How shall I live?" It is composed of nine essays, each preceded by a poem. These nine essays are largely based on lectures Emerson held throughout the country, including for a young, mercantile audience in the lyceums of the Midwestern boomtowns of the 1850s.

The Conduct of Life has been named as both one of Emerson's best works and one of his worst. It was one of Emerson's most successful publications and has been identified as a source of influence for a number of writers, including Friedrich Nietzsche.

== Publication ==
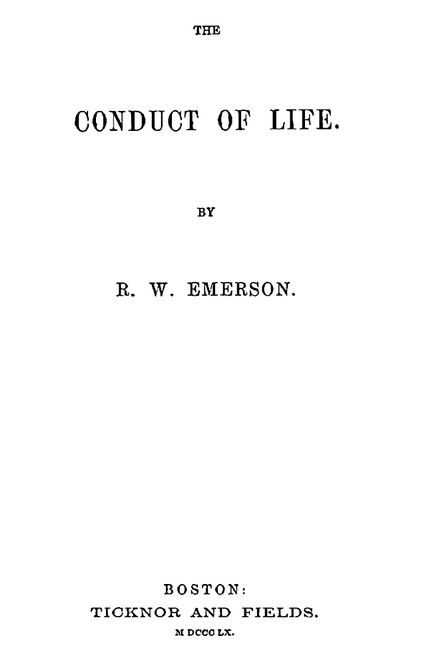
Title page of The Conduct of Life

Three years after publishing his English Traits, Boston's Ticknor & Fields announced on 27 December 1859, an "early appearance" of a new book by Emerson titled The Conduct of Life. Confirmed as "completed" on 10 November 1860, Emerson’s seventh major work came out on 12 December of the same year—simultaneously in the US and in Great Britain (published there by Smith, Elder & Co.). It was advertised as "matured philosophy of the transatlantic sage" and sold as a collector’s item "uniform in size and style with Mr. Emerson’s previous works." Quickly running through several editions in the U.S. (Ticknor & Fields announced a third edition only a week later) it was soon picked up by a third publisher (Cleveland’s Ingham & Bragg). In Great Britain, it was reported as "selling rapidly." Subsequently, several passages from the book appeared in popular U.S. newspapers, most of them quoting either from 'Wealth' or 'Behavior' (especially the 'Monk Basle'-passage and Emerson’s treatment of the human eye).

First translations of the book appeared during Emerson's lifetime in France (1864) and in Russia (1864). Still, the height of the book's international fame came around the turn of the 20th century, coinciding with a growing public interest in one of Emerson's most famous readers: Friedrich Nietzsche. Eventually, The Conduct of Life was translated into at least 13 different languages, including Serbian, Dutch and Chinese.

== Reception ==
Though hailed by Thomas Carlyle as "the writer's best book" and despite its commercial success, initial critical reactions to The Conduct Of Life were mixed at best. The Knickerbocker praised it for its "healthy tone" and called it "the most practical of Mr. Emerson's works," while The Atlantic Monthly attested that "literary ease and flexibility do not always advance with an author’s years" and thought the essays inferior to Emerson's earlier work. Yale’s The New Englander while complimenting Emerson's abilities, criticized the book as depicting "a universe bereft of its God" and described its author as writing "with the air of a man who is accustomed to be looked up to with admiring and unquestioning deference." Littell's Living Age found the book to contain the "weakest kind of commonplace elaborately thrown into unintelligible shapes" and claimed it to read in parts like an "emasculate passage of Walt Whitman." Others were no less critical, proclaiming that Emerson "has come to the end of what he had to say, and is repeating himself" (Athenaeum) or even calling him a "phrasemonger" and "second-hand writer" (Critic).

== Significance ==
While some critics like Harold Bloom place The Conduct of Life among Emerson's best work—Bloom calls it "a crucial last work for Americans"—it has only been paid little critical attention.

As The Conduct of Life is, in parts, thematically grouped around practical life issues (e.g. 'Power', 'Wealth'), it has been discussed as participating "in the aspirations of the contemporary conduct-of-life literature" while opening up possibilities of gender fluidity. Also, despite the stronger reconciliation between self and society compared to Emerson’s previous, more individualistic works, The Conduct of Life is in no way a one-sided affirmation of American society, especially 19th century capitalism. Rather, it can be seen as a holistic attempt to develop "principles for a good, natural, adequate conduct of life." As the dialectic approach of these essays often fails to come to tangible conclusions, critics like Ellen Vellela have described the whole book as weakly structured and repetitive. Others argue that "rather than trying to dissolve the ambiguous tension of Emerson’s texts, the different arguments should be valued as a part of a dialectic that productively captures the friction of opposing poles." In this way, "the workings of Emerson (…), as well as his aphoristic, succinct expressiveness could be characterized as Emersonian inceptions: getting us to start thinking, planting thoughts." Still others found an overarching unity of design to transcend the fragmentation of Emerson’s individual essays within the volume as a whole. More recent readings see Emerson as constructing an "ebb and flow within The Conduct of Life" that hints at transitionality as the "final reality of appearances."

== Essays ==
The following summaries/analyses are attempts to capture the essence of the essays from The Conduct of Life. The page numbers in brackets link to an online copy of the 1860 edition of the book on archive.org.

=== Fate ===
In this first essay, Emerson introduces the basic idealist principles of The Conduct of Life and seeks to reconcile the seemingly contradicting ideas of freedom and fate through a unifying Weltgeist-approach. He claims that even though the "bulk of mankind believe [sic] in two gods" (26)—namely free will and Providence—these concepts are really "under one dominion" (26) and expressions of the same beneficial force. "A breath of will blows eternally," he writes "through the universe of souls in the direction of the Right and Necessary." (23) Historical and societal events are therefore not merely an expression of individual actions and thought but result of "the will of all mind" (23) and necessitated by nature: "When there is something to be done, the world knows how to get it done." (33) Still, these cosmic processes do not disenfranchise the individual, but are based on an individual desire to actualize one’s true will—a will that makes individual freedom essential: "Liberty of the will (…) is the end and aim of this world." (30) Individual will and purpose, though, have very strict, biological limitations. While the "mind of all" might give birth to great men and leader figures, it also creates inherently inferior beings, as everyone’s individual future is "already predetermined in his lobes, and described in that little fatty face, pig-eye, and squat form." (8) Here, race and genetics play a crucial role in Emerson’s line of argumentation, when, by quoting the racist writings of Robert Knox and referring to phrenology and physiognomics, Emerson claims that the "strongest idea incarnates itself in majorities and nations, the healthiest and strongest." (10)

=== Power ===
Long before Friedrich Nietzsche’s coining of a similar phrase, Emerson’s essay claims that "life is a search after power" and that "a cultivated man, wise to know and bold to perform, is the end to which nature works" (45). In this framework, power is not only a desirable end, but also a natural attribute of powerful people. Such people stand out in every circle of society. The reasons for their power are their "causationism", self-reliance, and health. Power is thus not necessarily with the refined elite. In fact, "the instinct of the people is right" (54)—the heartland’s farmers’ natural way of living and their straight approach to concrete problems makes them apt to be rulers. This is a major concession of a New England intellectual to Jacksonian Democracy and a "popular government". However, it comes along with the optimist prospect that after all, "power educates the potentate" (53). In large parts, the text conceptualizes power as an attribute of a few special people. However, there is also a more pragmatic side to the text, which claims that concentration, use, and routine can also help to develop a powerful personality: "Practice is nine tenth" (67). In the end, the text reconciles this practical tendency with the intellectual approach to life: "We can easily overpraise the vulgar hero." (69)

=== Wealth ===
This text unfolds a two-sided approach to the notion of wealth: On the one hand, the economic side of the term is discussed in what seems to be a capitalist praise of America’s free market economy: "The only safe rule is found in the self-adjusting meter of demand and supply. (…) In a free and just commonwealth, property rushes from the idle and imbecile, to the industrious, brave, and preserving" (91). On the other hand, a criticism of early consumer-capitalism in the cities of Emerson’s time, where "society (…) is babyish, and wealth is made a toy" (80), brings about a redefinition of the term. Thereby, the wealthy individual is characterized as a culturally productive and well-educated member of society ("To be rich is to have a ticket of admission to the master-works and chief men of each race." 86), whilst the wealth of a society as a whole can be measured by the degree of (cultural) participation it offers its citizens ("in America, (…) the public should (…) provide this culture and inspiration to the citizen." 85-86). Thus, the term wealth is not reduced to being rich in pecuniary terms, but widened to cultural, moral and psychological aspects. In Emerson’s terms: "Wealth is mental; wealth is moral." (89)

=== Culture ===
By exploring the multitude of different facets of "culture", Emerson points out its complexity (and thereby its resistance to be defined in clear-cut terms). For him, culture should not only be understood in the context of social community, but also on the level of the individual: in fact, individuality is thought of as the basis of culture (cf. 116). More specifically, culture is conceptualized as self-cultivation in an educational sense – a life-long process which "cannot begin too early" (142). In a world that is driven by "the pursuit of power and of wealth as a means of power" (113), culture is a corrective force: it "corrects the theory of success" (113). It has a balancing effect, since it "modulate[s] the violence of any master-tones that have a droning preponderance in [man’s] scale" and thereby "redresses his balance" (118). As the physical sphere of this educational process Emerson praises the urban—the cities that "give us collision" (129)—as a place of intellectual stimulation just as he praises solitude, "to genius the stern friend" (134), which can be found in nature. Emerson breaks with the myth of culture being thought of as "high" culture: for him cultural competence is not only the acquisition of knowledge through literature, but more importantly an experiential process through the active involvement with and in nature: "Archery, cricket, gun and fishing rod, horse and boat, are all educators, liberalizers." (123)

=== Behavior ===
In this essay, Emerson uses the term "behavior" synonymously with the term "manners" and defines it as "the visible carriage or action of the individual" (147). Nature’s truth within the human being is exteriorized, made visible, through the "silent and subtile language" (147) of the human body as a fascinating means of non-verbal communication. Emerson celebrates "the wonderful expressiveness of the human body" (154) while especially emphasizing the eyes—"another self" (156)—as being the most universally understood, hence highly revealing (and almost erotic), means of interpersonal exchange. Emerson does not only conceptualize behavior as the basic mode of human expression, but also defines what it means to have good manners: "the basis of good manners is self-reliance" (162). To the list of desirable traits he also adds "integrity" (165), "directness" (168), "sincerity" (168), "uprightness" (168) and "self-control" (170). Once a person has the kinds of manners which "indicate real power" (164), "he or she must be considered, and is everywhere welcome, though without beauty, or wealth, or genius" (148). Here, manners are turned into a democratic means, which can transcend biological as well as social inequalities. At the same time, however, the selective function of manners operating in a society that "resists and sneers at you; or quietly drops you" (162) if you do not follow its rules is addressed. Only the true genius has the potential to overcome "all the observances, yea, and duties, which society so tyrannically imposes on the rank and file of its members." (163)

=== Worship ===
In this essay, Emerson describes and explains shifts in practices and objects of worship. He moves from skeptical concerns to a holistic religion to come, founded on morals and intellect, and merging faith, science, aesthetics, and arts. Worship is not limited to religious beliefs, but also relates to intellect, health, and beauty. Taken together, "the whole state of man is a state of culture; and its flowering and completion may be described as Religion, or Worship" (178). At the outset, Emerson diagnoses a decline of religion and moral beliefs. Large parts of the population tend to worship only science, wealth, and public opinion. Consequently, "we live in a transition period, where the old faiths (...) seem to have lost their force" (180). This can be devastating for communities if it results in a "distrust in human virtue" (183). But since Emerson is equally critical of demoralizing "know-nothing religions" (181), he says, "forget your books and traditions, and obey your moral perceptions" (187). Science, religion, and moral beliefs are indeed compatible—for those who see the "unity, intimacy, and sincerity" (191) in nature, which find expression, for example, in cause and effect. Accordingly, Emerson repeatedly emphasizes the importance of both mental and physical activity, encapsulated in his idea of "voluntary obedience" or "necessitated freedom" (209). Emerson envisages the future religion to be intellectual and the future church to be grounded in moral science.

=== Considerations by the way ===
This essay revolves around certain recurring and intertwined aspects of Emerson’s thought—most notably, society, culture, morals, nature, the meaning of life, and friendship. Emerson says that, while fine souls are empowering and inspiring, fine society is excluding and deadening. Similarly, he does not wish "to concede anything to 'the masses', but to tame, drill, divide, and break them up, and draw individuals out of them" (219). They are "unripe, and have not yet come to themselves, do not yet know their opinion" (221). Individualism, to Emerson, is crucial to intellectual and historical achievements. One of the most central lessons to learn is "the good of evil" (222). Antagonism is vital to nature. In both the private and social spheres, many great achievements "are brought about by discreditable means" (225). Emerson concludes that humans are indebted to their vices (228). As for the development of character, it is essential to "know the realities of human life" (230). In addition to self-reliance, Emerson’s advice is to live a healthy life and to be productive. Also, friends "to whom we can say what we cannot say to ourselves," (236) as well as people "who shall make us do what we can" (239), are essential. Emerson closes the essay on an encouraging note by saying, "life brings to each his task, and whatever art you select, (…) begin at the beginning, proceed in order, step by step" (243). His concluding remarks resonate with many of his other writings: he demands "the escape from all false ties; courage to be what we are; and love of what is simple and beautiful; independence, and cheerful relation to add something to the well-being of men." (244)

=== Beauty ===
Emerson next turns to Beauty, a topic he dealt with in Nature in 1836. Looking at beauty from different angles, Emerson works toward solving the problem of defining beauty by exploring examples, counterexamples, and qualities of beauty. In this last essay on Beauty, Emerson is less systematic than in his three-section investigation of beauty in Nature. First comes a criticism of science for moving far away "from its objects!" (247) More explicitly, "All our science lacks a human side." (248). Defining beauty in order to encourage a return to affection, Emerson writes, "Beauty is the form under which the intellect prefers to study the world. All privilege is that of beauty; for there are many beauties; as, of general nature, of the human face and form, of manners, of brain, or method, moral beauty, or beauty of the soul." (252). Then ensues a study of beauty through examples and explanations, "We ascribe beauty to that which is simple; which has no superfluous parts; which exactly answers its ends; which stands related to all things; which is the mean of many extremes. It is the most enduring quality and the most ascending quality." (254). Investigating beauty in nature, society, rhetoric, art, architecture, and women, he comments "The line of beauty is the result of perfect economy" and "Beauty is the quality which makes to endure" (259). The comparison of beauty to ugliness brings Emerson to the essence of his argument, "Things are pretty, graceful, rich, elegant, handsome, but, until they speak to the imagination, not yet beautiful." (266). The conclusion begs for a broader and more integrated understanding of the world:

"Thus there is a climbing scale of culture, from the first agreeable sensation which a sparkling gem or scarlet stain affords the eye, up through fair outlines and details of the landscape, features of the human face and form, signs of tokens of thought and character in manners, up to the ineffable mysteries of the intellect." (269)

The last passage in the essay is "the perception of Plato, that globe and universe are rude and carly expressions of an all-dissolving Unity, —the first stair on the scale to the temple of the Mind."

=== Illusions ===
The final essay of the book, 'Illusions', is more clearly structured than 'Beauty'. It begins with Emerson’s recollections about his trip to Mammoth Cave in Kentucky and his reflection on the illusion of the night sky when he went into the 'Star Chamber': "Some crystal specks in the black ceiling high overhead, reflecting the light of a half-hid lamp, yielded this magnificent effect." (274). In a closer examination of sensory perception, Emerson writes "Our conversation with Nature is not just what it seems" (274) and "[the] senses interfere everywhere and mix their own structure with all they report of it." (275). Turning to illusions in society, Emerson writes: "Nobody drops his domino" and "[…] we rightly accuse the critic who destroys too many illusions. Society does not love its unmaskers." (276). Here, he offers an aphorism: "Life is a succession of lessons which must be lived to be understood." (277). Emerson continues to examine specific illusions, most notably marriage as a (happy) illusion: "We live amid hallucinations; and this especial trap is laid to trip up our feet with, and all are tripped up first or last." (279). He then suggests options for dealing with illusions: "Whatever games are played with us, we must play no games with ourselves, but deal in our privacy with the last honesty and truth." (285). Emerson turns back to a spiritual connection at the conclusion of the essay and the collection: "We see God face to face every hour, and know the savor of Nature." (286).

There is no chance, and no anarchy, in the universe. All is system and gradation. Every god is there sitting in his sphere. The young mortal enters the hall of the firmament: there he is alone with them alone, they pouring on him benedictions and gifts, and beckoning him up to their thrones. On the instant, and incessantly, fall snow-storms of illusions. He fancies himself in a vast crowd which sways this way and that, and whose movement and doings he must obey: he fancies himself poor, orphaned, insignificant. The mad crowd drives hither and thither, now furiously commanding this thing to be done, now that. What is he that he should resist their will, and think or act for himself Every moment, new changes, and new showers of deceptions, to baffle and distract him. And when, by and by, for an instant, the air clears, and the cloud lifts a little, there are the gods still sitting around him on their thrones, —they alone with him alone. THE END.

— Ralph Waldo Emerson, The Conduct of Life (287-8)

== Cultural contexts ==
=== Brook Farm ===
In accordance with Emerson’s increasingly conservative notion of society, The Conduct of Life formulates a critique of the Brook Farm community, a utopist experiment in communal living founded by his colleague and fellow transcendentalist George Ripley in 1841. While intellectually in agreement with the community’s goals at the time, Emerson declined an invitation to participate, listing mostly personal reasons (like having "little skill to converse with people" and "I think that all I shall solidly do, I must do alone") and "skepticism in regard to the general practicability of the plan" for his decision. In The Conduct of Life, written some two decades after the Brook Farm experiment ended, Emerson strictly distances himself from what he now calls "Arcadian fanaticism" (99) and describes the commune’s ultimate demise as having "cured [its participants] of their faith that scholarship and practical farming (…) could be united." (99) "The genius of reading and of gardening", he argues in ‘Wealth’, "are antagonistic, like resinous and vitreous electricity." (100)

=== Civil War ===
In his Essay 'Emerson' (1898), John Jay Chapman claims with regards to Emerson that "not a boy in the land welcomed the outbreak of the war so fiercely as did this shy village philosopher." For Emerson, the Civil War "was sure to bring in character, to leave behind it a file of heroes; if not heroes, then villains, but in any case strong men," Chapman states. Indeed, The Conduct Of Life, written during the political run-up to secession and published after the bombardment of Fort Sumter, finds Emerson embracing the idea of war as a means of national rebirth. "Wars, fires, plagues," Emerson writes in ‘Considerations by the Way’, "break up immovable routine, clear the ground of rotten races and dens of distemper, and open a fair field to new men." (223) In nature, Emerson argues, creation is always preceded by destruction and in the intensity of conflict and battle, humanity shines ever more brightly: "civil war, national bankruptcy, or revolution, [are] more rich in the central tones than languid years of prosperity." (230)

=== Walt Whitman ===
When Walt Whitman came to Boston in March 1860 to meet the publishers for his third edition of Leaves of Grass, he spent a day with Emerson, who had been one of Whitman’s earliest supporters, to discuss his new poems. Troubled by their sexual explicitness, Emerson urged the young poet to "expurgate" his work. Whitman refused and, later in his life, came to sum up this experience as "If you can't walk into popularity on your feet, crawl in on your hands and marrows." The Conduct of Life, which Emerson was composing around that time, seems to recall that discussion and puts Emerson’s critique of Whitman in a societal and cultural perspective. In a passage in 'Culture,' Emerson demonstrates that censure can benefit the poet—and that refusal to accept censure can be looked at as anti-democratic:

"The poet, as a craftsman, is only interested in the praise accorded to him, and not in the censure, though it be just. And the poor little poet hearkens only to that, and rejects the censure, as proving incapacity in the critic. But the poet cultivated becomes a stockholder in both companies, — say Mr. Curfew, — in the Curfew stock, and in the humanity stock; and, in the last, exults as much in the demonstration of the unsoundness of Curfew, as his interest in the former gives him pleasure in the currency of Curfew. For, the depreciation of his Curfew stock only shows the immense values of the humanity stock. As soon as he sides with his critic against himself, with joy, he is a cultivated man."

— Ralph Waldo Emerson, The Conduct of Life (136)

== Bibliography ==
- Cayton, Mary Kupiec. "The Making of an American Prophet: Emerson, His Audiences, and the Rise of the Culture Industry in Nineteenth-Century America." Lawrence Buell, ed. Ralph Waldo Emerson. A Collection of Critical Essays, 1992: 77-100.
- Ellison, Julie. "The Gender of Transparency: Masculinity and the Conduct of Life," American Literary History, Vol.4, No.4: 584.
- Francis, Richard Lee. "Necessitated Freedom: Emerson's ‘The Conduct of Life’," Studies in the American Renaissance, 1980: 73-89.
- Gougeon, Len. Virtue's Hero. Emerson, Antislavery, and Reform. Athens, Georgia: UG Press, 2010.
- Myerson, Joel (Editor). Emerson and Thoreau: The Contemporary Reviews. Cambridge: Cambridge University Press, 1992.
- Reaver, J. Russell. "Emerson's Focus in ‘The Conduct of Life’," South Atlantic Bulletin, Vol. 45, No. 4, 1980: 78-89.
- Robinson, David M.. Emerson and the Conduct of Life: Pragmatism and Ethical Purpose in the Later Work. Cambridge University Press, 1993.
- Stern, Madeleine B.. "Emerson and Phrenology," Studies in the American Renaissance, 1984: 213-228
- Sturm, Rita Lillian. "The Dialectic Imagery in Emerson's ‘The Conduct of Life’," Ann Arbor: University Microfilms, 1978.
- Villela, Ellen. "Emerson and The Conduct of Life," The English Review, 1, No. 2, 1973: 6-27.
