= Treaty (disambiguation) =

Treaties are binding agreements under international law.

Treaty or treaties or variation may also refer to:

- a particular treaty, see List of treaties
- Treaty (festival), a music festival held at Tandanya National Aboriginal Cultural Institute, Adelaide, South Australia, from 2020
- Treaty, Indiana, USA; an unincorporated community
- "Treaty" (song), a 1991 song by Yothu Yindi

== See also ==
- Indigenous treaties in Australia
- The Numbered Treaties (ie. Treaty 6, Treaty 8, etc)
- Unequal treaty
- Search for disambiguation pages for "treaty"
- Search for disambiguation pages for "treaties"
- Treatise (disambiguation)
