= True Fire =

Orchestral piece by Kaija Saariaho

- by Kaija Saariaho
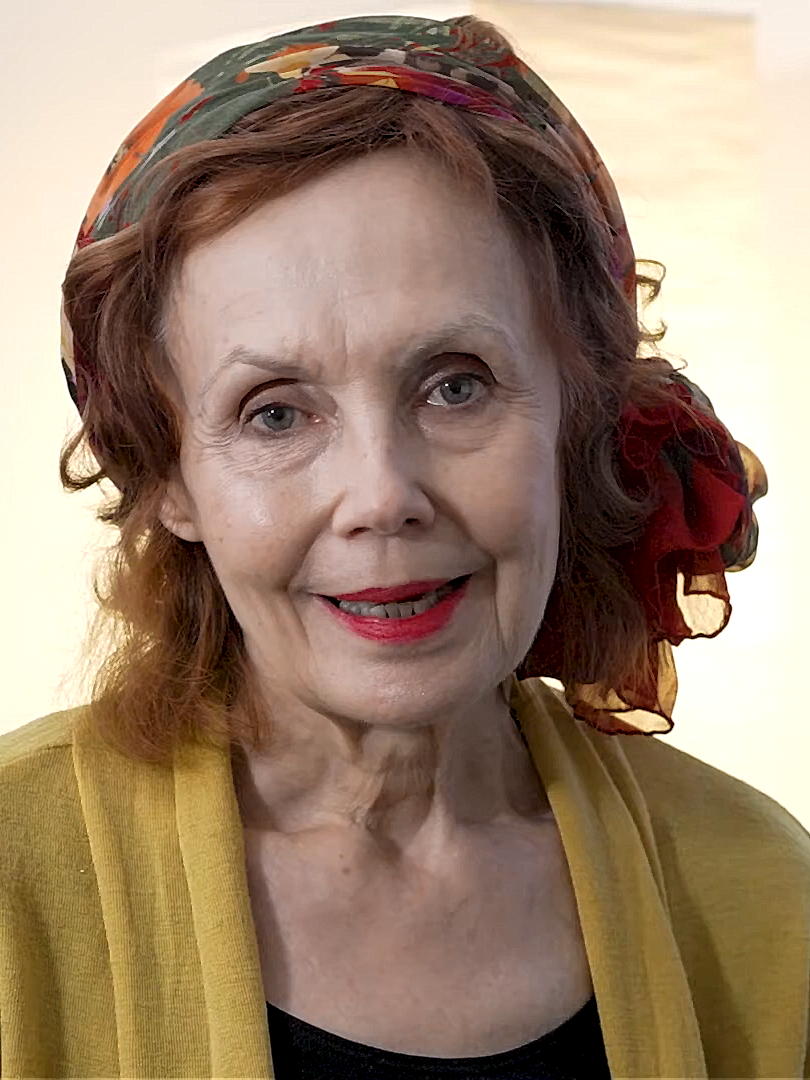
- Saariaho in 2022
- Genre: song cycle
- Scoring: solo baritone and orchestra

True Fire is a song cycle for solo baritone and orchestra by the Finnish composer Kaija Saariaho, on a libretto collaged from multiple sources by dramaturg Aleksi Barrière. The work was jointly commissioned by the Los Angeles Philharmonic, the NDR Symphony Orchestra, the BBC Symphony Orchestra and the Orchestre National de France. It was first performed at the Walt Disney Concert Hall in Los Angeles on May 14, 2015, by the baritone Gerald Finley and Los Angeles Philharmonic under the conductor Gustavo Dudamel. The piece is dedicated to Gerald Finley.

== Composition ==
True Fire has a duration of roughly 25 minutes and is composed in six movements:

1. Proposition I
2. River
3. Proposition II
4. Lullaby
5. Farewell
6. Proposition III

The first movement "Proposition I" is based on a text by the essayist and poet Ralph Waldo Emerson ("Spiritual Laws" from Essays: First Series). The second movement "River" is based on a text by the poet Seamus Heaney adapted from a poem by Marin Sorescu. "Proposition II" is also based the Emerson essay and was described by the composer as "the heart of the piece." The fourth movement "Lullaby" is based on a traditional Tewa song. "Farewell", taken from the poetry of Mahmoud Darwish, draws the piece into a darker mood, before the final movement "Proposition III" concludes the piece with a "sensation of weightless energy".

The work's title is taken from Emerson's essay's final sentence, that concludes also the work's last movement: "We know the authentic effects of the true fire through every one of its million disguises."

Saariaho described her intent for piece in the score program note, writing, "My preliminary idea was to explore the baritone voice in the context of various texts, finding an organic way to access the different colors of the voice through the texts."

=== Instrumentation ===
The work is scored for solo baritone and an orchestra comprising three flutes (doubling piccolo and alto flute), two oboes, three clarinets (doubling bass clarinet), two bassoons (doubling contrabassoon), four horns, three trumpets, three trombones, tuba, timpani, three percussionists, harp, and strings.

== Reception ==
True Fire has been praised by music critics. Reviewing the world premiere, Mark Swed of the Los Angeles Times wrote, "The performance was strong. Dudamel remained constantly attuned to Saariaho's vastly changeable instrumental colors, a cosmic sonic background for Finley, who handled each song with operatic intensity, part of a grand psychodrama of searching for meaning, for words that can obtain meaning through music but can also become emptied of meaning when sung." He added, "This is a profound, important work." Henry Schlinger of Culture Spot LA observed, "...the orchestral writing was superb, plumbing the depths of the color and timbre, and the LA Phil pulled it off splendidly. Compositions like True Fire have to be heard and seen in person; it is almost like performance art."

Conversely, Donna Perlmutter of LA Observed gave the piece a negative review, remarking, "True Fire [...] was overly long at 30 minutes, considering its unrelieved, dirge-like stretches of doom and gloom. Singer Gerald Finley has had more grateful opportunities and the merely respectful audience buzzed with conspicuous naysayers afterward in the lobby."
