= Edmund Elys =

Edmund Elys (Ellis) (c. 1633 – 1708) was an English clergyman, poet and versatile writer. Considered eccentric, he encountered personal troubles before finally losing his living as a non-juror after the Glorious Revolution. He was connected both to Quakers and to leading academics such as Henry More and John Wallis.

== Life ==
He was born at Haccombe, Devon, the son of Edmund Elys, rector of East Allington, by his wife Ursula, daughter of John Carew of Haccombe. After receiving some preliminary instruction from William Hayter at Exeter, he entered Balliol College, Oxford, as a commoner in Lent term 1651, was admitted probationer fellow of that house 29 November 1655, having taken his B.A. degree on 16 October previously, and proceeded M.A. 11 June 1658. He resigned his fellowship 1 November 1659, in which year he succeeded his father in the rectory of East Allington.

He had written royalist poetry, and was taken prisoner by Major John Blackmore, a Parliamentarian soldier who had been in command of Exeter Castle and sat as MP for East Looe in Cornwall. Blackmore (on the later account of Elys) regarded him as a potential traitor.

In 1666 other 'prodigious afflictions fell on me', he later wrote. His living was under sequestration in 1677, and he found himself 'forced to abscond about London.' In 1680 he was confined in the King's Bench and other prisons. On the accession of William III, Elys, for refusing to take the oaths, was deprived of his rectory. He retired to Totnes.

During the reign of James II, Elys supported James's moves to extend religious toleration, arguing against anti-Catholicism. Although he does not appear ever to have joined them, he was a warm friend of the Quakers, whose principles he defended in numerous leaflets. He wrote against George Keith; his own views, as presented for example in a 1697 work, have been called "illuminationist". He defended innate ideas, against John Locke's Essay Concerning Human Understanding, in another work from 1697.
