= Essays: First Series =

1841 book by Ralph Waldo Emerson

Essays: First Series is a series of essays written by Ralph Waldo Emerson, published in 1841, concerning transcendentalism.

== Essays ==
The book contains:

1. "History"
2. "Self-Reliance"
3. "Compensation"
4. "Spiritual Laws"
5. "Love"
6. "Friendship"
7. "Prudence"
8. "Heroism"
9. "The Over-Soul"
10. "Circles"
11. "Intellect"
12. "Art"

== Reception ==
Many noted the influence of Thomas Carlyle. An anonymous English reviewer voiced the mainstream view when he wrote that the author of the book "out-Carlyles Carlyle himself," "imitat[ing] his inflations, his verbiage, his Germanico-Kantian abstractions, his metaphysics and mysticism." Jane Welsh Carlyle agreed, giving her impression in a letter to John Sterling: "I find him getting affected, stilted, mystical, and in short 'a considerable of a bore' A bad immitation [sic] of Carlyle's most Carlylish translations of Goethes [sic] most Goetheish passages!" For his part, Sterling described them to William Coningham as "the only book of any pith and significance that has dawned here lately . . . which at a glance, seem far ahead in compass and brilliancy of almost everything England has of late years (generations) produced".

== Musical setting ==
Three fragments from the essay "Spiritual Laws" form the backbone of composer Kaija Saariaho's True Fire for baritone and orchestra (2014), a piece of music that collages texts from various sources. The piece's title is taken from the essay's final sentence, that concludes also the setting: "We know the authentic effects of the true fire through every one of its million disguises."

== See also ==
- Essays: Second Series
