= New England Reformers =

The "New England Reformers" was a lecture by Ralph Waldo Emerson read before "The Society" in Amory Hall, on Sunday, March 3, 1844. "The Society" has been identified as the American Anti-Slavery Society, led by William Lloyd Garrison.

In this lecture Emerson commented that men "are conservatives after dinner...".

Men are conservatives when they are least vigorous, or when they are most luxurious. They are conservatives after dinner, or before taking their rest; when they are sick, or aged: in the morning, or when their intellect or their conscience have been aroused, when they hear music, or when they read poetry, they are radicals.
