= Treatise on Money =

Treatise on money may refer to

- Monetae cudendae ratio, also called Treatise on Money, 1526 paper by Nicolaus Copernicus
- A Treatise on Money, 1930 book by John Maynard Keynes
