= The Over-Soul =

1841 essay by Ralph Waldo Emerson

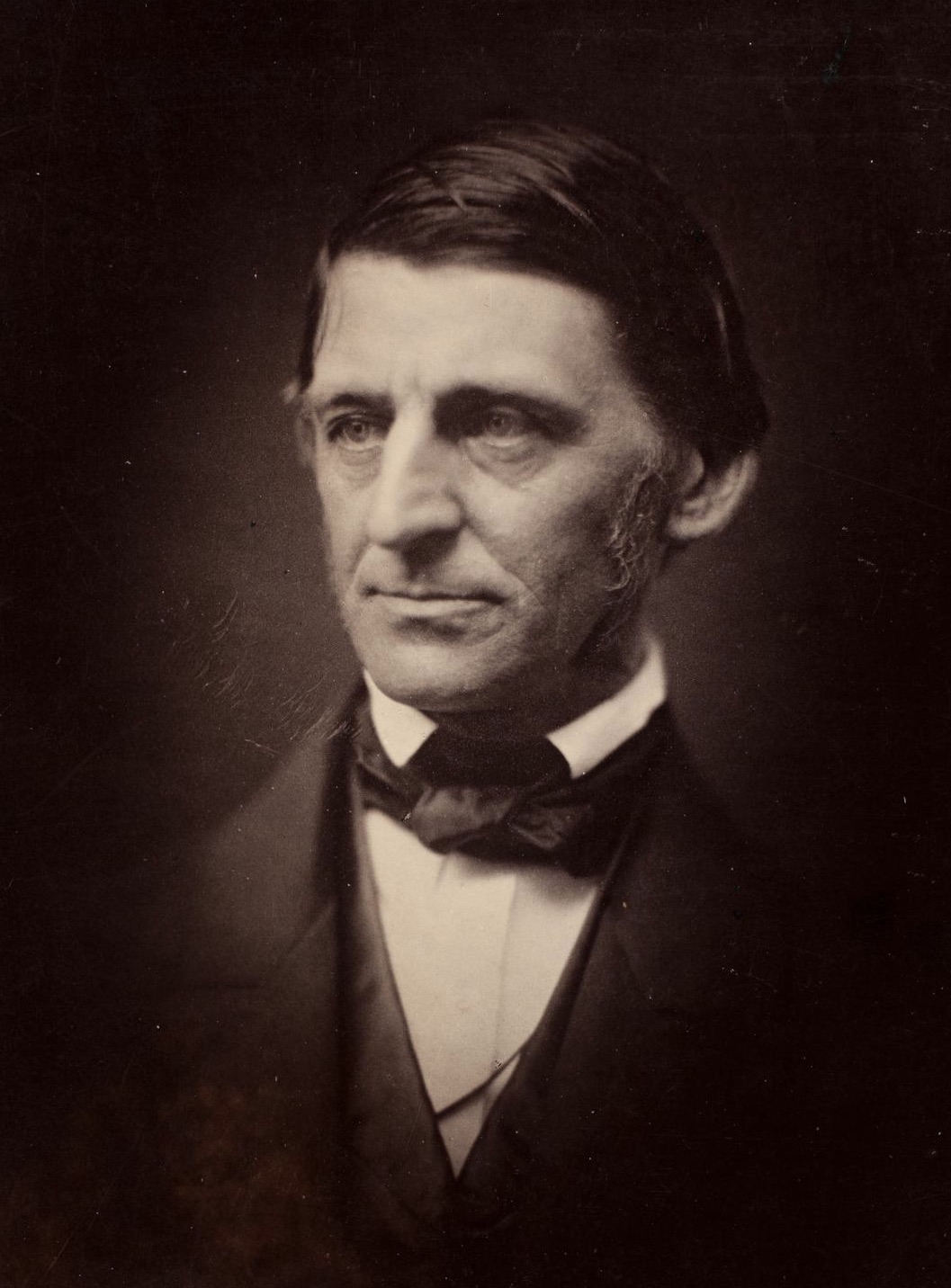
- Ralph Waldo Emerson by Josiah Johnson Hawes, 1857
- Author: Ralph Waldo Emerson
- Series: Essays
- Genre: Essay
- Publication date: 1841
- Pages: 28
- Preceded by: Heroism
- Followed by: Circles
- Text: "The Over-Soul" at Wikisource

"The Over-Soul" is an essay by Ralph Waldo Emerson first published in 1841. With the human soul as its overriding subject, several general themes are treated: (1) the existence and nature of the human soul; (2) the relationship between the soul and the personal ego; (3) the relationship of one human soul to another; and (4) the relationship of the human soul to God. The influence of Eastern religions, including Vedanta, is plainly evident, but the essay also develops ideas long present in the Western philosophical canon (e.g., in the works of Plato, Plutarch, Plotinus, Proclus—all of whose writings Emerson read extensively throughout his career) and the theology of Emanuel Swedenborg.

With respect to the four themes listed above, the essay presents the following views: (1) the human soul is immortal, immensely vast, and beautiful; (2) the conscious ego is slight and limited in comparison to the soul despite the fact that humans habitually mistake their ego for their true self; (3) at some level, the souls of all people are connected, but the precise manner and degree of this connection is not spelled out; and (4) that the soul is created by and has an existence that is similar to God, or that God exists within humans.

The essay is now considered one of Emerson's greatest writings, though some scholars have argued that attempts to cast it as a keystone to understanding his work are misguided.

== History ==
The essay includes the following passage:

The Supreme Critic on the errors of the past and the present, and the only prophet of that which must be, is that great nature in which we rest, as the earth lies in the soft arms of the atmosphere; that Unity, that Over-soul, within which every man's particular being is contained and made one with all other; that common heart.

For Emerson the term denotes a supreme underlying unity which transcends duality or plurality, much in keeping with the philosophy of Advaita Vedanta. This non-Abrahamic interpretation of Emerson's use of the term is further supported by the fact that Emerson's Journal records in 1845 suggest that he was reading the Bhagavad Gita and Henry Thomas Colebrooke's essays on the Vedas. Emerson goes on in the same essay to further articulate his view of this dichotomy between phenomenal plurality and transcendental unity:

We live in succession, in division, in parts, in particles. Meantime within man is the soul of the whole; the wise silence; the universal beauty, to which every part and particle is equally related, the eternal ONE. And this deep power in which we exist and whose beatitude is all accessible to us, is not only self-sufficing and perfect in every hour, but the act of seeing and the thing seen, the seer and the spectacle, the subject and the object, are one. We see the world piece by piece, as the sun, the moon, the animal, the tree; but the whole, of which these are shining parts, is the soul.

"Over-soul" has more recently come to be used by Eastern philosophers such as Meher Baba and others as the closest English language equivalent of the Vedic concept of Paramatman. (In Sanskrit the word param means "supreme" and atman means "soul"; thus Paramatman literally means "Supreme-Soul".) The term is used frequently in discussion of Eastern metaphysics and has also entered western vernacular. In this context, the term "Over-soul" is understood as the collective indivisible Soul, in which all individual souls or identities are included. The experience of this underlying reality of the indivisible "I am" state of the Over-soul is said to be veiled from the human mind by sanskaras, or impressions, acquired over the course of evolution and reincarnation. Such past impressions form a kind of sheath between the Over-soul and its true identity, as they give rise to the tendency of identification with the gross differentiated body. Thus the world, as apperceived through the impressions of the past appears plural, while reality experienced in the present, unencumbered by past impressions (the unconditioned or liberated mind), perceives itself as the One indivisible totality, i.e. the Over-soul.

== See also ==
- Anima Mundi
- Adi Shankara
- Anaxagoras
- Brahman
- Collective unconscious
- Global brain
- God Speaks
- Homecoming Saga
- Jainism
- Jane Roberts
- Mana (Mandaeism)
- Nanua Bairagi
- Noosphere
- Ontology
- Orphism (religion)
- Posidonius
- Swedenborg
- Vitalism
