= The Poet (essay) =

Essay by Ralph Waldo Emerson

"The Poet" is an essay by U.S. writer Ralph Waldo Emerson, written between 1841 and 1843 and published in his Essays: Second Series in 1844. It is not about "men of poetical talents, or of industry and skill in meter, but of the true poet." Emerson begins the essay with the premise that man is naturally incomplete, since he "is only half himself, the other half is his expression."

Emerson says that a poet represents humanity, as one that acknowledges interdependence between the material and spiritual world:

And this hidden truth, that the fountains whence all this river of Time, and its creatures, floweth, are intrinsically ideal and beautiful, draws us to the consideration of the nature and functions of the Poet, or the man of Beauty, to the means and materials he uses, and to the general aspect of the art in the present time.

== Overview ==
In the essay, Emerson expresses the need for the United States to have its own new and unique poet to write about the new country's virtues and vices:

Our logrolling, our stumps and their politics, our fisheries, our Negroes, and Indians, our boasts, and our repudiations, the wrath of rogues, and the pusillanimity of honest men, the northern trade, the southern planting, the western clearing, Oregon, and Texas, are yet unsung.

The final lines in the essay read as follows:

Wherever snow falls or water flows or birds fly, wherever day and night meet in twilight, wherever the blue heaven is hung by clouds or sown with stars, wherever are forms with transparent boundaries, wherever are outlets into celestial space, wherever is danger, and awe, and love, there is Beauty, plenteous as rain, shed for thee, and though thou shouldest walk the world over, thou shalt not be able to find a condition inopportune or ignoble.

== Insights ==
The essay offers a profound look at the poem and its role in society. In a paragraph mid-essay, Emerson observes:

For poetry was all written before time was, and whenever we are so finely organized that we can penetrate into that region where the air is music, we hear those primal warblings, and attempt to write them down, but we lose ever and anon a word, or a verse, and substitute something of our own, and thus miswrite the poem. The men of more delicate ear write down these cadences more faithfully, and these transcripts, though imperfect, become the songs of the nations. For nature is as truly beautiful as it is good, or as it is reasonable, and must as much appear, as it must be done, or be known. Words and deeds are quite indifferent modes of the divine energy. Words are also actions, and actions are a kind of words.

== Influence ==
The essay played an instrumental role in the 1855 appearance of the first edition of Walt Whitman's collection of poems, Leaves of Grass. After reading the essay, Whitman consciously set out to answer Emerson's call. When the book was first published, Whitman sent a copy to Emerson, whose letter in response helped launch the book to success. In that letter Emerson called the collection "the most extraordinary piece of wit and wisdom America has yet contributed".
