= Compensation (essay) =

1841 essay by Ralph Waldo Emerson

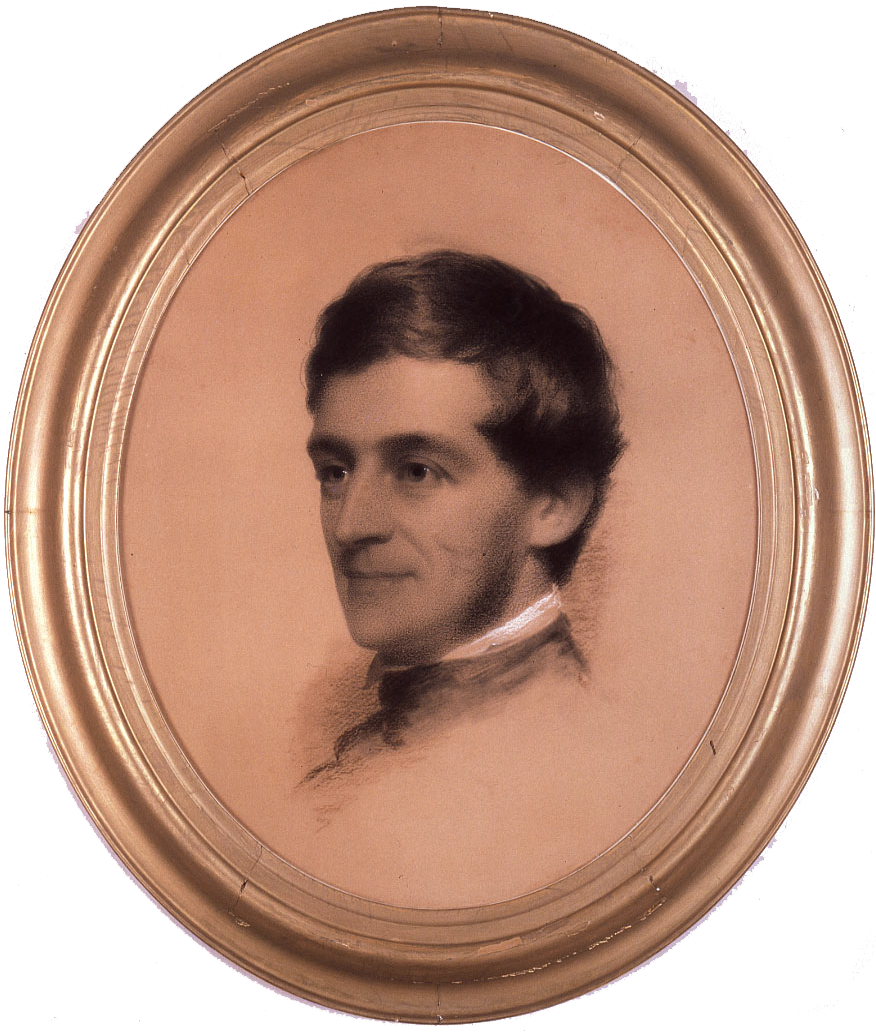
Ralph Waldo Emerson

"Compensation" is an essay by Ralph Waldo Emerson. It appeared in his book Essays, first published in 1841. In 1844, Essays: Second Series was published, and subsequent editions of Essays were renamed Essays: First Series.

== Summary ==
The essay addresses the topic of karma or cause and effect. Emerson contends that everywhere in nature there is dualism. Dualism is present within us because it balances life instead of having excess to destroy. Opposites like action/reaction, day/night, up/down, even/odd and spirit/matter are used to balance the universe. We must all use moderation in life, instead of excess which can cause defects in our lives. If there is excess it needs to be moderated for proper balance.

== See also ==
- "Self-Reliance"
