= Politics (essay) =

"Politics" is an essay written by Ralph Waldo Emerson. It is part of his Essays: Second Series, published in 1844. A premier philosopher, poet and leader of American transcendentalism, he used this essay to belie his feelings on government, specifically American government. His impact on New England thought and his views on pragmatism influenced the likes of Henry David Thoreau, Orestes Brownson, and Friedrich Nietzsche, among others.

== Summary ==
Although not viewed as his most important essay in the second series, Emerson’s views on politics championed democracy and individualism, two ideas that are viewed today as undoubtedly American. By 1844, Emerson, then 41, had moved into a pragmatic balance of skepticism and idealism, happily providing him with “a way to dream as well as a way to live”. A quintessential American voice, Emerson believed that civilization was only beginning and could reach unfathomable places through moral force and creative intelligence. This alone is not a reason to blindly follow the footsteps before us. Remember, he says, “The law is only a memorandum.” This gives rise to the most popular quote in this essay: “The less government we have the better.”

Emerson believed that an ideal government, aside from a nonexistent one dissolved when improvements in human character through love and wisdom could abolish the state, was one that advocated for the growth of the individual, and be able to protect one’s individual rights. The individual would only be ready for democracy when they had become completely independent and self-reliant. Then the abolishment of government could be achieved. The intelligence needed from each individual would triumph over business interests and politics, because the mind is the richest asset you can have.

Emerson also questioned property rights in Politics, noting that they are built not on democracy, but instead on owning. Believing that “property will always follow persons," Emerson believed personal rights were much more important than property rights.

== The state ==
Emerson’s overwhelming faith in the individual is completely opposite to his views on nations: “Every actual state is corrupt.” Political parties are “made out of necessity” of the time period and not out of any underlying theory. Emerson is very critical of both major parties in his essay. “From neither party, when in power, has the world any benefit to expect in science, art or humanity, at all commensurate with the resources of the nation.” Neither party is satisfactory for Emerson, and his essay he hints at the natural inequality this system adheres to, and its effects. Party politics are not the only organization Emerson has his eye on in his essay, however. Emerson also distrusts the pulpit and the press because they are conventional roles that require organizational persuasion.
