= Self-Reliance =

1841 essay by Ralph Waldo Emerson

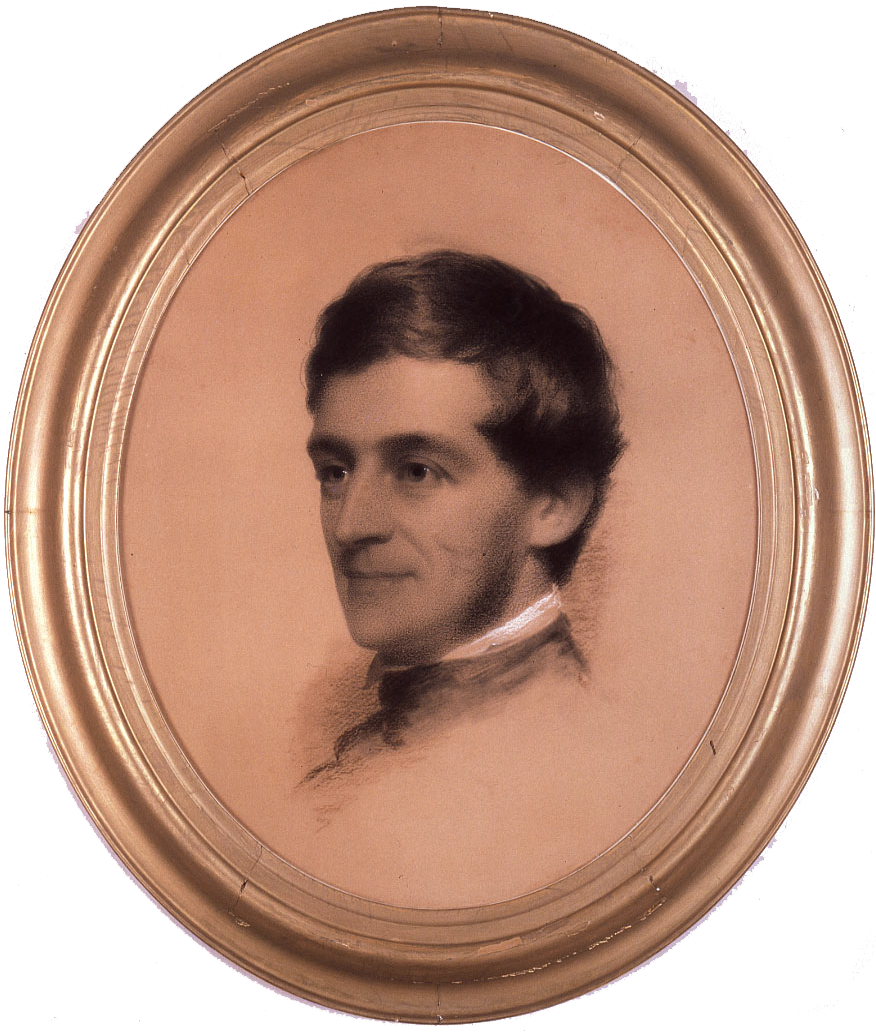
Ralph Waldo Emerson's essay called for staunch individualism.

"Self-Reliance" is an 1841 essay written by American transcendentalist philosopher Ralph Waldo Emerson. It contains the most thorough statement of one of his recurrent themes: the need for each person to avoid conformity and false consistency, and follow their own instincts and ideas. It is the source of one of his most famous quotations:

"A foolish consistency is the hobgoblin of little minds, adored by little statesmen and philosophers and divines."

This essay is an analysis into the nature of the "aboriginal self on which a universal reliance may be grounded". Emerson emphasizes the importance of individualism and its effect on a person's satisfaction in life, explaining how life is "learning and forgetting and learning again".

== History ==
The first hint of the philosophy that would become "Self-Reliance" was presented by Ralph Waldo Emerson as part of a sermon in September 1830 a month after his first marriage. His wife Ellen was sick with tuberculosis and, as Emerson's biographer Robert D. Richardson wrote, "Immortality had never been stronger or more desperately needed!"

From 1836 into 1837, Emerson presented a series of lectures on the philosophy of history at Boston's Masonic Temple. These lectures were never published separately, but many of his thoughts in these were later used in "Self-Reliance" and several other essays. Later lectures, such as "The American Scholar" and the Divinity School Address, by Emerson led to public censure of his radical views, the staunch defense of individualism in "Self-Reliance" being a possible reaction to that censure.

"Self-Reliance" was first published in his 1841 collection, Essays: First Series. Emerson helped start the beginning of the Transcendentalist movement in America. "Self-Reliance" is one of Emerson's most famous essays. Emerson wrote on "individualism, personal responsibility, and nonconformity."

Emerson had a very large background of religious affiliations. His father was a Unitarian minister; Emerson eventually followed in his father's footsteps to become a minister as well. Emerson's religious practices can be viewed as unconventional and his beliefs, non-traditional. Emerson understood that individuals are inexplicably different and ideas are constantly changing. He encouraged religious individuals to "breathe new life into the old forms of their religion."

The Transcendentalist movement flourished in New England and proposed a revolutionarily new philosophy of life. This new philosophy drew upon old ideas of Romanticism, Unitarianism, and German Idealism as well as the American republican tradition. Some of these ideas pertained closely to the values of America at the time. These values included nature, individualism, and reform, and can be noted in Emerson's essay.

== Themes ==
Emerson's themes include the authority of the individual, according to Anne Marie Hacht. Nothing has authority over the self, she says. One particular temptation is to find enlightenment in history but Emerson argues that it can only come from individual searching. He believes that truth is inside a person and this is an authority, not institutions like religion.

Emerson's essay focuses and consistently relates back to one major theme: "Trust thyself".

One of the most prevalent themes in the essay is nonconformity. Emerson states,

"Whoso would be a man must be a nonconformist".

He counsels his readers to do what they think is right no matter what others think.

Haijing Liang, in her analysis of "Self-Reliance", explains how Emerson "encourages the readers to free themselves from the constraints of conformity and give themselves back to their nature".

Solitude and the community appear within the essay multiple times. Emerson wrote how the community is a distraction to self-growth, by friendly visits, and family needs. He advocates more time being spent reflecting on one's self. This can also happen in the community through strong self-confidence. This would help the counseled to not sway from his beliefs in groups of people. Emerson mentions "but the great man is he who in the midst of the crowd keeps with perfect sweetness the independence of solitude."

Spirituality, specifically the idea that truth is within one's self, is a recurring theme in Emerson's essay. Emerson posits that reliance upon institutionalized religion hinders the ability to grow mentally as an individual.

The theme of individualism is often proposed within "Self-Reliance". Emerson explains the ultimate form of happiness is achieved when a person learns and adapts an individualistic lifestyle based on their own values. Emerson emphasizes, "Nothing can bring you peace but yourself. Nothing can bring you peace but the triumph of principles."

The conflict between originality and imitation is often an oscillating theme in the essay. Emerson emphasizes that "Envy is ignorance, imitation is suicide." Near the end, he encourages society: "Insist on yourself; never imitate."

== Criticism ==
Herman Melville's 1851 novel Moby-Dick has been read as a critique of Emerson's philosophy of self-reliance, embodied particularly in the life and death of Ahab. Melville's critique of self-reliance as a way of life is seen to lie in its destructive potential, especially when taken to extremes. Richard Chase writes that for Melville,

"Death – spiritual, emotional, physical – is the price of self-reliance when it is pushed to the point of solipsism, where the world has no existence apart from the all-sufficient self."

In that regard, Chase sees Melville's art as antithetical to that of Emerson's thought, in that Melville

"[points] up the dangers of an exaggerated self-regard, rather than, as ... Emerson loved to do, [suggested] the vital possibilities of the self."

Newton Arvin further suggests that self-reliance was, for Melville, really the

"[masquerade in kingly weeds of] a wild egoism, anarchic, irresponsible, and destructive."

Although never directly stated, Emerson's "Self-Reliance" has religious influences tied into the values and beliefs presented. Critics argue that Emerson believes the Universe is not complete without "The Spirit". Without some form of spirituality or religious tendencies, society and the universe "is sad, hopeless, and largely meaningless." In his work, the transcendentalist argues that no person, specifically individuals who are self-reliant, exists without a slight connection to a higher power. Mark Cladis, author of a published religious analysis of "Self-Reliance", argues individuals are

"intimately connected to that which is greater than the self alone."

Emerson encourages his readers to understand that self-reliance is

"freedom in a spiritual universe that is just as rule-governed as the Newtonian physical universe".

Cladis explains that individuals are not expected to endure life alone; achieving self-reliance is understanding that

"we are surrounded by helps and aids of all kinds, supporting us, sustaining us, journeying always with us."

== In popular culture ==
Emerson's quote, "A foolish consistency is the hobgoblin of little minds", is a running joke in the 1998 film Next Stop Wonderland. A single woman (portrayed by Hope Davis), who is familiar with the Emerson quote, goes on dates with several men, each of whom tries to impress her by referencing the line, but misquotes it and misattributes it to W.C. Fields, Karl Marx, or Cicero.

This quote is also referenced in one of the episodes of the television show The Mentalist when Patrick Jane meets a crime boss and they start a dialogue. It was also stated in the 1989 film Dream a Little Dream in reference to a group of teenagers who regularly take a short cut through the backyard of an older couple, it is used as well in the 1972 comedy film What's Up, Doc?

Isaac Asimov, in author's notes to his collection of mystery short stories, Asimov's Mysteries, invokes the quote with the single word "Emerson!" whenever one story in the collection, set in a common universe, appears to contradict another. For instance, the story "The Dying Night" appears to contradict the background of "The Singing Bell". Asimov relates how he was introduced to the quotation while reviewing proofs of an article with his co-authors.

== Bibliography ==
- Emerson, Ralph Waldo (1982) [1841]. Ziff, Larzer (ed.). Selected Essays. Penguin American Library. introduction by L. Ziff. Harmondsworth. pp. 175–203. ISBN 0-14-039013-8.
- Porte, Joel; Morris, Saundra, eds. (1999). The Cambridge Companion to Ralph Waldo Emerson. Cambridge, UK: Cambridge University Press. See especially pp. 13–30 & 106–111. ISBN 0-521-49611-X.
