= Nature (essay) =

1836 essay by Ralph Waldo Emerson

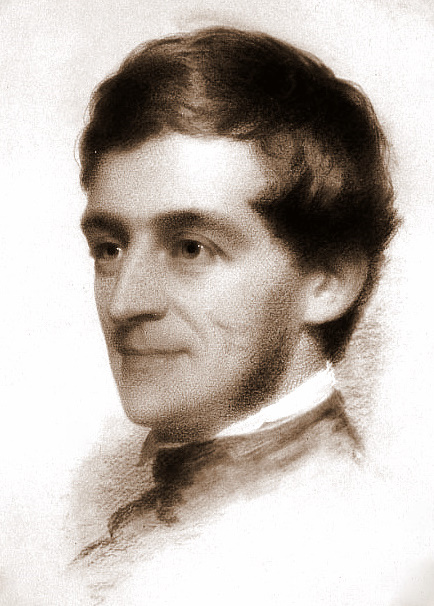
Emerson by Eastman Johnson, 1846

Nature is a book-length essay written by Ralph Waldo Emerson, published by James Munroe and Company in 1836. In the essay Emerson put forth the foundation of transcendentalism, a belief system that espouses a non-traditional appreciation of nature. Transcendentalism suggests that the divine, or God, suffuses nature, and suggests that reality can be understood by studying nature. Emerson's visit to the Muséum National d'Histoire Naturelle in Paris inspired a set of lectures he later delivered in Boston which were then published.

Within the essay, Emerson divides nature into four usages: Commodity, Beauty, Language, and Discipline. These distinctions define the ways by which humans use nature for their basic needs, their desire for delight, their communication with one another, and their understanding of the world. Emerson followed the success of Nature with a speech, "The American Scholar", which together with his previous lectures laid the foundation for transcendentalism and his literary career.

== Synopsis ==
In Nature, Emerson lays out and attempts to solve an abstract problem: that humans do not fully accept nature's beauty. He writes that people are distracted by the demands of the world, whereas nature gives but humans fail to reciprocate. The essay consists of eight sections: Nature, Commodity, Beauty, Language, Discipline, Idealism, Spirit and Prospects. Each section adopts a different perspective on the relationship between humans and nature.

In the essay Emerson explains that to experience the wholeness with nature for which we are naturally suited, we must be separate from the flaws and distractions imposed on us by society. Emerson believed that solitude is the single mechanism through which we can be fully engaged in the world of nature, writing "To go into solitude, a man needs to retire as much from his chamber as from society. I am not solitary whilst I read and write, though nobody is with me. But if a man would be alone, let him look at the stars."

When a person experiences true solitude, in nature, it "take[s] him away". Society, he says, destroys wholeness, whereas "Nature, in its ministry to man, is not only the material, but is also the process and the result. All the parts incessantly work into each other's hands for the profit of man. The wind sows the seed; the sun evaporates the sea; the wind blows the vapor to the field; the ice, on the other side of the planet, condenses rain on this; the rain feeds the plant; the plant feeds the animal; and thus the endless circulations of the divine charity nourish man."

Emerson defines a spiritual relationship. In nature a person finds its spirit and accepts it as the Universal Being. He writes: "Nature is not fixed but fluid. Spirit alters, moulds, it. ... Know then that the world exists for you. For you is the phenomenon perfect."

== Analysis ==
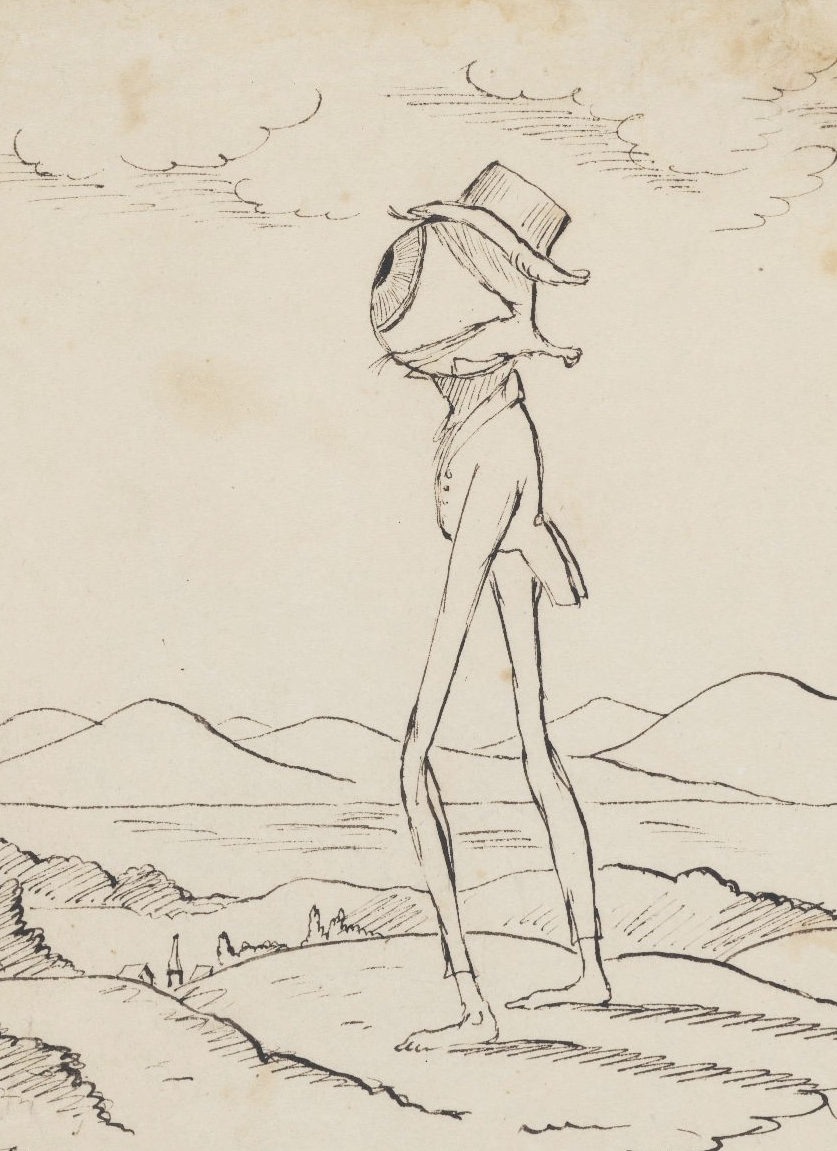
Illustration of Emerson's transparent eyeball metaphor in "Nature" by Christopher Pearse Cranch, ca. 1836-1838

Emerson uses spirituality as a major theme in the essay. Emerson believed in re-imagining the divine as something large and visible, which he referred to as nature; such an idea is known as transcendentalism, in which one perceives a new God and a new body, and becomes one with his or her surroundings. Emerson exemplifies transcendentalism, stating, "From the earth, as a shore, I look out into that silent sea. I seem to partake its rapid transformations: the active enchantment reaches my dust, and I dilate and conspire with the morning wind", postulating that humans and the wind are one. Emerson referred to nature as the "Universal Being"; he believed that there was a spiritual sense of the natural world around him. Depicting this sense of "Universal Being", Emerson writes, "The aspect of nature is devout. Like the figure of Jesus, she stands with bended head, and hands folded upon the breast. The happiest man is he who learns from nature the lesson of worship".

According to Emerson, there were three spiritual problems addressed about nature for humans to solve: "What is matter? Whence is it? And Whereto?" Emerson suggests that such questions can be answered with a single answer, as nature's spirit is expressed through humans, "Therefore, that spirit, that is, the Supreme Being, does not build up nature around us, but puts it forth through us". Emerson depicts that everything must be spiritual and moral, in which there should be goodness between nature and humans.

== Influence ==
Nature was controversial to some. One review published in January 1837 criticized the philosophies in Nature and disparagingly referred to the beliefs as "Transcendentalist", coining the term by which the group would become known.

Henry David Thoreau had read Nature as a senior at Harvard College and took it to heart. It eventually became an essential influence for Thoreau's later writings, including his seminal Walden. In fact, Thoreau wrote Walden after living in a cabin on land that Emerson owned. Their longstanding acquaintance offered Thoreau great encouragement in pursuing his desire to be a published author.

Emerson's views in Nature were also an influence on Charles Stearns Wheeler building a shanty at Flints Pond in 1836. Considered the first Transcendentalist outdoor living experiment, Wheeler used his shanty during his summer vacations from Harvard from 1836 to 1842. Thoreau stayed at Wheeler's shanty for six weeks during the summer of 1837, and got the idea that he wanted to build his own cabin (later realized at Walden in 1845). The exact location of the Wheeler shanty site was discovered by Jeff Craig in 2018, after a five-year search effort.
