= Circles (essay) =

1841 essay by Ralph Waldo Emerson

"Circles" is an essay by Ralph Waldo Emerson, first published in 1841.

The essay consists of a philosophical view of the vast array of circles one may find throughout nature. In the opening line of the essay Emerson states "The eye is the first circle; the horizon which it forms is the second; and throughout nature this primary figure is repeated without end".

== See also ==
- Oikeiôsis
