= Les Essarts =

Les Essarts is the name of several places in France:

It is the name of several communes:

- Les Essarts, in the Eure département
- Les Essarts, in the Loir-et-Cher département
- Les Essarts, in the Vendée département

It is also part of the name of several communes:

- Les Essarts-le-Roi, in the Yvelines département
- Les Essarts-lès-Sézanne, in the Marne département
- Les Essarts-le-Vicomte, in the Marne département

Several communes have a similar name: see Les Essards (disambiguation)

Les Essarts is also the name of the Forbes family estate in Saint-Briac-sur-Mer.

Essarts designates in French a spot in a forest supposed to be deforested (see assarting).

== See also ==
- Les Essards (disambiguation)
