= Elliot Forbes =

American conductor and musicologist (1917–2006)

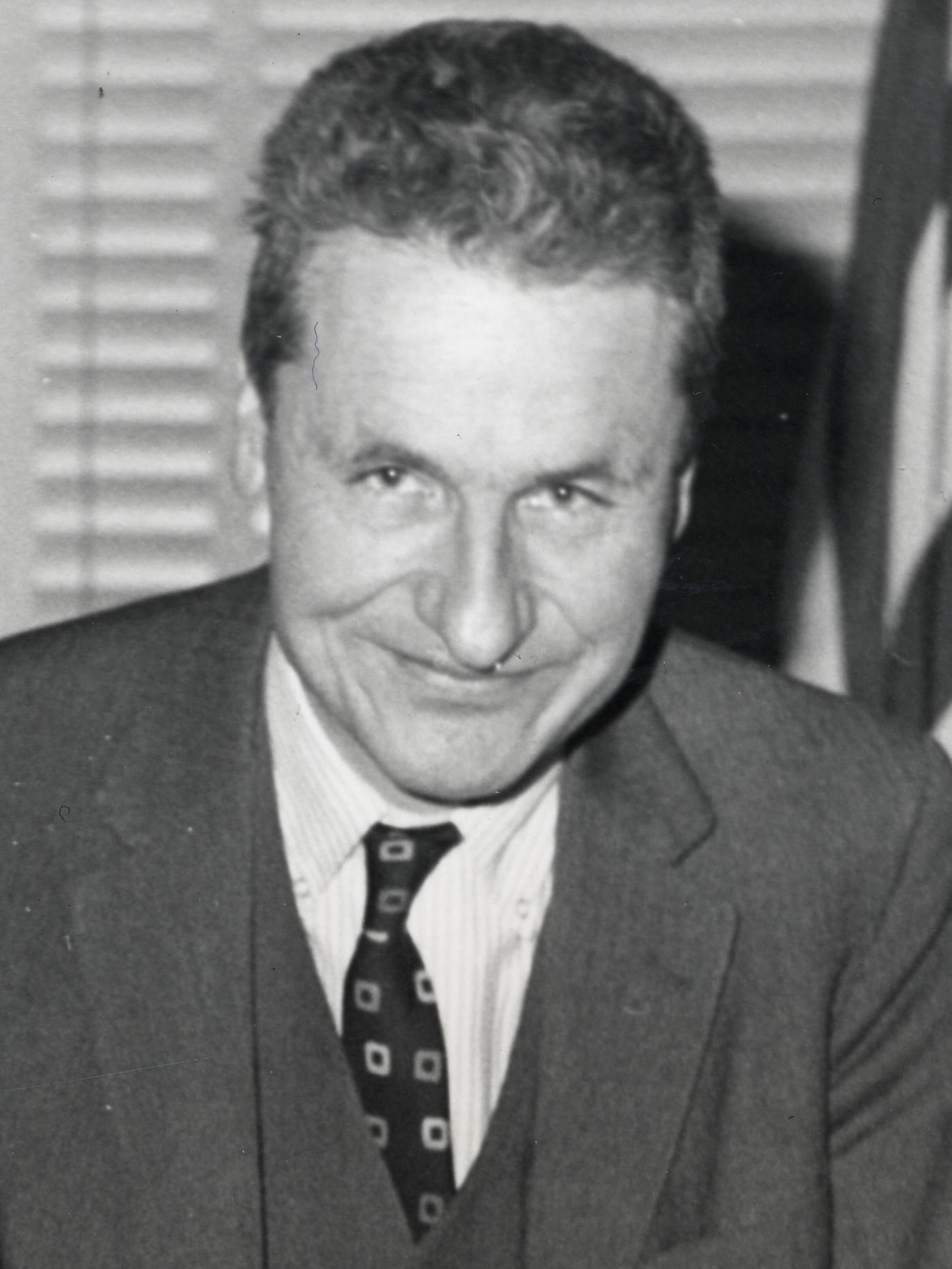
- Forbes c. 1964
- Born: 20 August 1917; Cambridge, Massachusetts, United States
- Died: 9 January 2006 (aged 88)
- Education: Harvard University (MA)
- Spouse: Kathleen Allen
- Parent(s): Edward Forbes; Margaret Laighton

Elliot Forbes (August 20, 1917 – January 9, 2006), known as "El", was an American conductor and musicologist noted for his Beethoven scholarship.

== Life and career ==
Forbes came from a Boston Brahmin family; his parents were, Edward Forbes, was the director of Harvard's Fogg Art Museum, and Margaret Laighton. He attended Harvard University, receiving a BA in 1941 and an MA in 1947, both in music; he studied with Walter Piston, and while he was a graduate student, he was the assistant conductor of the Harvard Glee Club. From 1947 to 1958, he taught at Princeton University, but in 1958 he returned to Harvard and remained there for the rest of his life as Fanny Peabody Professor of Music (and, after 1984, Professor Emeritus.)

He was the chief conductor of the Harvard Glee Club and Radcliffe Choral Society from 1958 to 1970; his students included Isaiah Jackson, now director of the Pro Arte Chamber Orchestra of Boston, and William Christie, founder and director of the European baroque ensemble Les Arts Florissants. While conductor, he led both groups on a tour around the world in 1967.

Aside from conducting, his scholarly work focused on the life and work of Beethoven, particularly his choral music. His edition of Thayer's Life of Beethoven (1964) has been called "a substantial contribution to Beethoven scholarship". He also wrote two notable volumes of the history of music at Harvard, and edited the Harvard-Radcliffe Choral Music Series. He was on the boards of the New England Conservatory, Pro Arte Chamber Orchestra, and Isabella Stewart Gardner Museum, whose piano is dedicated in his honor.

He received Harvard's Alumni Medal in 1991 and an honorary doctorate in 2003. Right up to his death, he remained an unflagging supporter of undergraduate performers, frequently attending events at which he was the only faculty member present.

Forbes married Kathleen Brooks Allen. His grandson is musician Ed Droste from Grizzly Bear.

== Ancestry ==
Ancestors of Elliot Forbes

John Forbes
William Forbes
Sarah Hathaway
Edward Forbes
Ralph Emerson
Edith Emerson
Lydia Jackson
Elliot Forbes
Margaret Laighton

== Notable works ==
- A Neglected Work in Beethoven's Choral Music: the Funeral Cantata, Essays on Music in Honor of Archibald Thompson Davison (Cambridge, Massachusetts, 1957), 253–61
- Ed.: Thayer's Life of Beethoven (Princeton, NJ, 1964, 2/1967)
- The Choral Music of Beethoven, American Choral Review, xi/3 (1968–9) [whole issue]
- Beethoven as a Choral Composer, PRMA, xcvii (1970–71), 69–82
- Beethoven's Choral Music: a Reappraisal, American Choral Review, xxiv/2–3 (1982), 67–82
- A History of Music at Harvard (Cambridge, Massachusetts, 1988–93)
