= Hemsleya =

Scientific classification
- Kingdom: Plantae
- Clade: Embryophytes
- Clade: Tracheophytes
- Clade: Angiosperms
- Clade: Eudicots
- Clade: Rosids
- Order: Cucurbitales
- Family: Cucurbitaceae
- Genus: Hemsleya; Cogn. ex F.B.Forbes & Hemsl.

Genus of flowering plants

Hemsleya is a genus of flowering plants belonging to the family Cucurbitaceae.

Its native range is Eastern Himalayas to southern China and Papuasia. It is native to the countries of Assam (in India), Bismarck Archipelago (island group, part of Papua New Guinea), China, East Himalayas, Maluku Islands, New Guinea, Thailand and Vietnam.

The genus name of Hemsleya is in honour of William Hemsley (1843–1924), an English botanist. It was first described and published in J. Linn. Soc., Bot. Vol.23 on page 490 in 1888.

== Known species ==
According to Kew:

- Hemsleya amabilis Diels
- Hemsleya carnosiflora C.Y.Wu & Z.L.Chen
- Hemsleya chengyihana D.Z.Li
- Hemsleya chinensis Cogn. ex F.B.Forbes & Hemsl.
- Hemsleya cirromitrata (W.J.de Wilde & Duyfjes) H.Schaef. & S.S.Renner
- Hemsleya delavayi (Gagnep.) C.Jeffrey ex C.Y.Wu & C.L.Chen
- Hemsleya dipteriga Kuang & A.M.Lu
- Hemsleya dolichocarpa W.J.Chang
- Hemsleya dulongjiangensis C.Y.Wu
- Hemsleya ellipsoidea L.T.Shen & W.J.Chang
- Hemsleya emeiensis L.T.Shen & W.J.Chang
- Hemsleya endecaphylla C.Y.Wu
- Hemsleya gigantha W.J.Chang
- Hemsleya graciliflora (Harms) Cogn.
- Hemsleya kunmingensis H.T.Li & D.Z.Li
- Hemsleya lijiangensis A.M.Lu ex C.Y.Wu & Z.L.Chen
- Hemsleya macrocarpa (Cogn.) C.Y.Wu ex C.Jeffrey
- Hemsleya macrosperma C.Y.Wu
- Hemsleya mitrata C.Y.Wu & Z.L.Chen
- Hemsleya panacis-scandens C.Y.Wu & Z.L.Chen
- Hemsleya panlongqi A.M.Lu & W.J.Chang
- Hemsleya peekelii (W.J.de Wilde & Duyfjes) H.Schaef. & S.S.Renner
- Hemsleya pengxianensis W.J.Chang
- Hemsleya sphaerocarpa Kuang & A.M.Lu
- Hemsleya turbinata C.Y.Wu
- Hemsleya zhejiangensis C.Z.Zheng

== Other sources ==
- Li, D. Z. 1993. Systematics and evolution of Hemsleya (Cucurbitaceae). Yunnan Science & Technology Press. 1–126. Note: accepts
- Schaefer, H. & S. S. Renner. 2011. Phylogenetic relationships in the order Cucurbitales and a new classification of the gourd family (Cucurbitaceae). Taxon 60:122-138. Note: accepts
- Schaefer, H. et al. 2009. Gourds afloat: a dated phylogeny reveals an Asian origin of the gourd family (Cucurbitaceae) and numerous oversea dispersal events. Proc. Roy. Soc. Biol. Sci. Ser. B 276:847. Note: should be included in Gomphogyne
