= Briag =

Irish Saint

Saint Briag
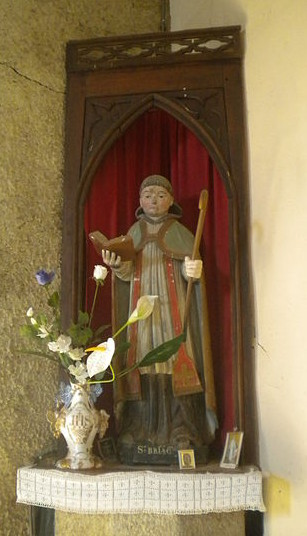
- Born: 6th century Ireland
- Died: c. 555; Bourbriac, Brittany
- Venerated in: Roman Catholic Church
- Feast: 17 December

Saint Briag (Breton) or Briac (French) was an Irish monk who came to Brittany in the company of Saint Tudwal. His feast day is 17 December.

== Biography ==
Born of Irish nobility, he lived during the sixth century. After his studies, he left his country to join a monastery in Wales led by the abbot Tudwal. They landed in Armorica, Brittany and evangelized the entire north coast. Saint Briag is invoked for the cure of mental illnesses. He is said to have endowed the village with a miraculous spring, thus healing all these afflictions. He died around the year 555 and his tomb is today in Bourbriac in Côtes-d'Armor where he founded a monastery.

The commune Saint-Briac-sur-Mer is named for Saint Briag. Today, Briag is a common given name in Breton with several variant spellings and derivations, including Brian or Bryan.

== Legend and reality ==
The entire history of Briag depends on a text written by the Breton monk Albert Le Grand in 1632, 11 centuries after the legendary life of the saint, and based on some no longer existing 12th century manuscripts. There is no other historical trace of the saint. His cult did not definitively appear until the 16th century. A more historical study of the saint shows that he probably did not live in the 6th century. Furthermore, the name Briag/Briac/Briacc does not appear in any Irish sources, but is Brittonic or even Breton similar to many names in the region which end in -ac. It is more likely that Briag was a monk in Upper Brittany in the 10th century who was sent to Lower Brittany to help with the re-catechization of the Bretons after the devastation of the Vikings.
