= Neogoezia =

Scientific classification
- Kingdom: Plantae
- Clade: Tracheophytes
- Clade: Angiosperms
- Clade: Eudicots
- Clade: Asterids
- Order: Apiales
- Family: Apiaceae
- Subfamily: Apioideae
- Tribe: Oenantheae
- Genus: Neogoezia; Hemsl.

Genus of flowering plants

Neogoezia is a genus of flowering plants belonging to the family Apiaceae.

It is native to Mexico.

The genus name of Neogoezia is in honour of Edmund Goeze (1838–1929), a German gardener and botanist. He was a botanical museum director in Coimbra, Portugal and also botanical garden inspector in Greifswald. It was first described and published in Bull. Misc. Inform. Kew 1894 on page 354 in 1894.

== Known species ==
According to Kew:

- Neogoezia breedlovei Constance
- Neogoezia gracilipes (Hemsl.) Hemsl.
- Neogoezia macvaughii Constance
- Neogoezia minor Hemsl.
- Neogoezia planipetala (Hemsl.) Hemsl.
