= Forbes family =

Family in Boston, Massachusetts, US

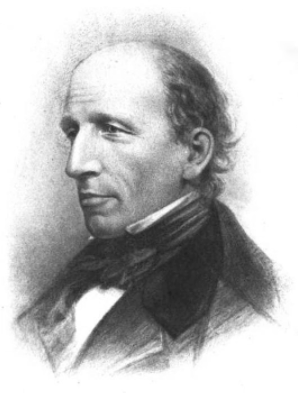
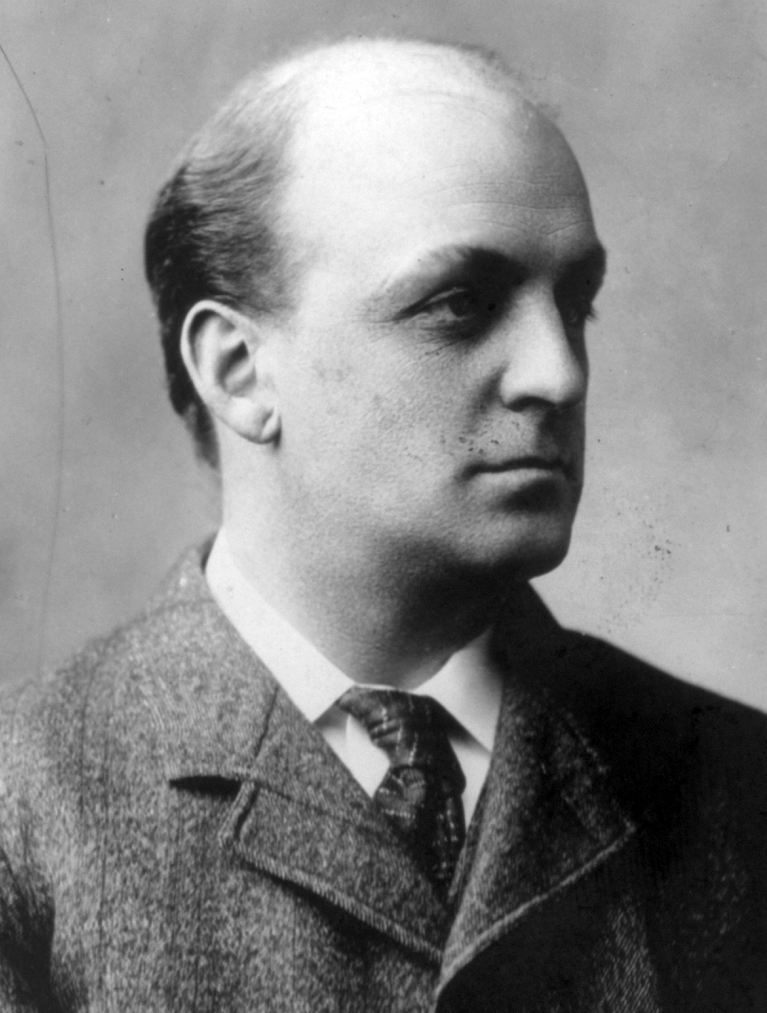
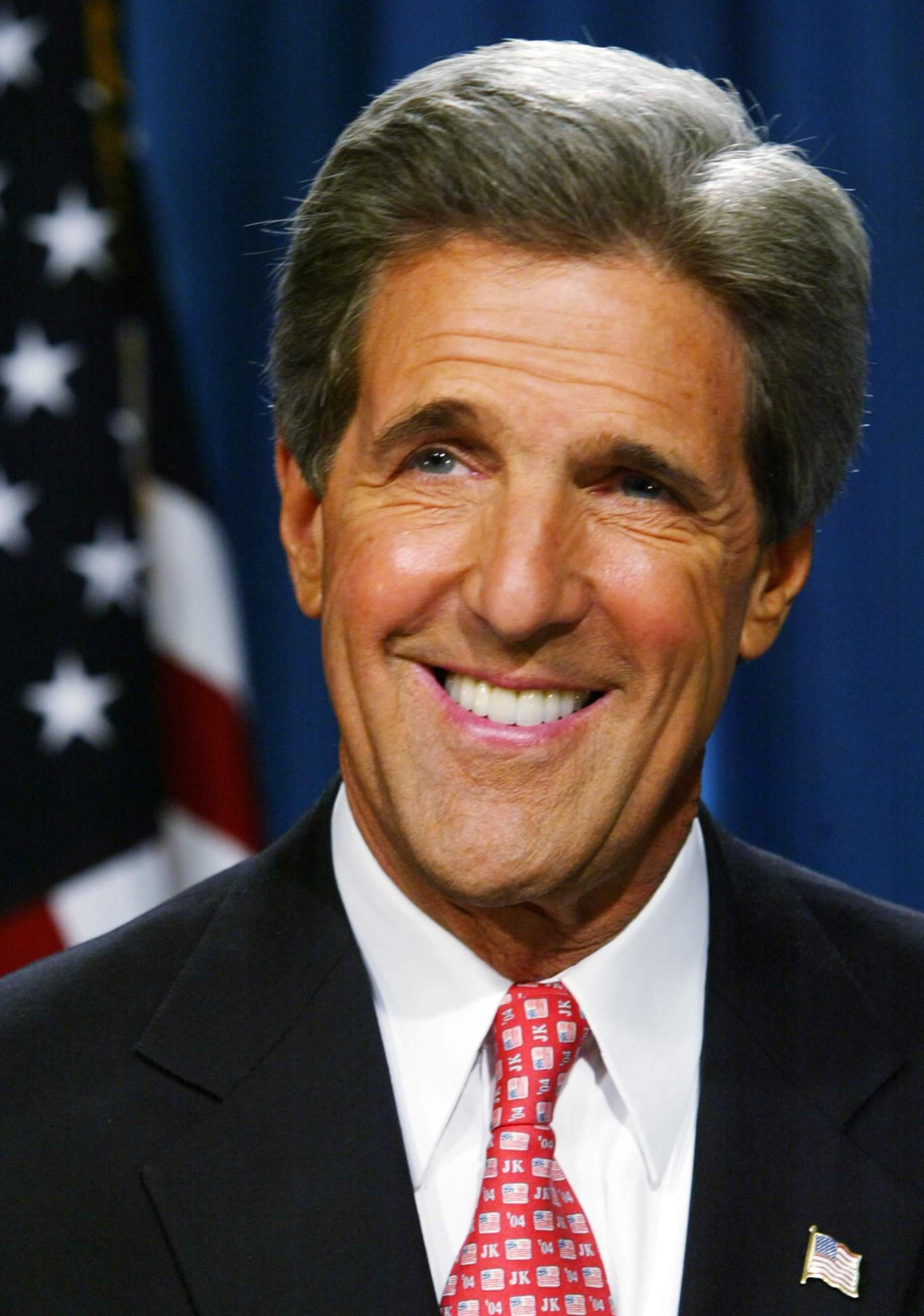
- John Murray Forbes William Cameron Forbes John Forbes Kerry
- Current region: Boston, Massachusetts
- Origin: Aberdeenshire, Scotland
- Connected families: Cabot, Griswold
- Estates: Les Essarts, Naushon Island

The Forbes family is one of the components of the Boston Brahmins—a wealthy extended American family long prominent in Boston, Massachusetts. The family built their initial multi-generational fortune primarily through the transatlantic slave trade, West Indian commerce, and smuggling opium into China. The family's wealth-building strategy relied heavily on these interconnected maritime global networks. The name descends from Scottish immigrants and can be traced back to Sir John de Forbes in Scotland in the 12th century. Family members include businessman John Murray Forbes (1813–1898), part of the first generation who accumulated wealth, and politician John Forbes Kerry (born 1943).

== Family origins ==
The first member of the Forbes family to live in the United States was Rev. John Forbes (1740–1783). He was a clergyman who arrived in the colonies in 1763. The Reverend's first post on the North American continent was in British East Florida, where he became the first Anglican clergyman licensed to officiate during the British period of 1763–1783. The Forbes family has a link to the Dudley–Winthrop family directly from Thomas Dudley (1576–1653), father of Anne Bradstreet (1612–1672), the first English-language female poet from America. John Forbes left Florida for Boston in 1769 and married Dorothy Murray on February 2, 1769 in Milton, Massachusetts, where their first son James Grant Forbes was born. John Forbes has two other sons: John Murray Forbes and Ralph Bennet Forbes.

== Accumulation of wealth ==
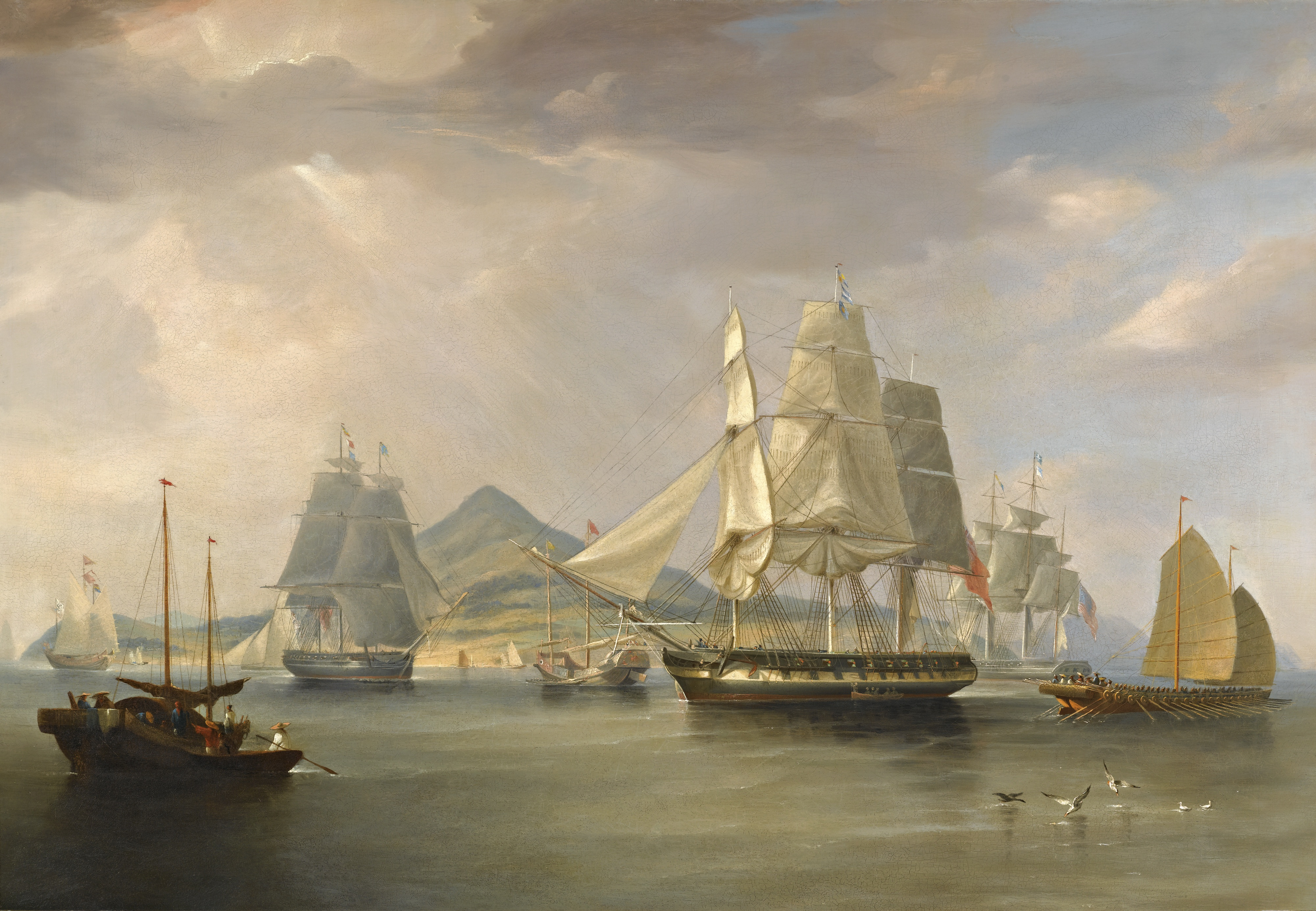
Opium ships at Lintin (Nei Lingding Island, Chinese: 内伶仃岛, Nei Lingding Dao, 'Inner Lingding Island') in 1824, by William John Huggins

=== Trade with China ===
The Boston trading firm Perkins & Company sent many young men of their extended family to participate in their business activities abroad. Ralph Forbes being married to Margaret Perkins, their children were encouraged in the business. Following the death overseas of his older brother, Thomas Tunno Forbes, the Perkinses encouraged John Murray Forbes to travel to China, too. There John was mentored by the Chinese merchant Houqua who treated him like a son and therefore entrusted very significant sums of capital to invest on his behalf in the US after he left China (see below).

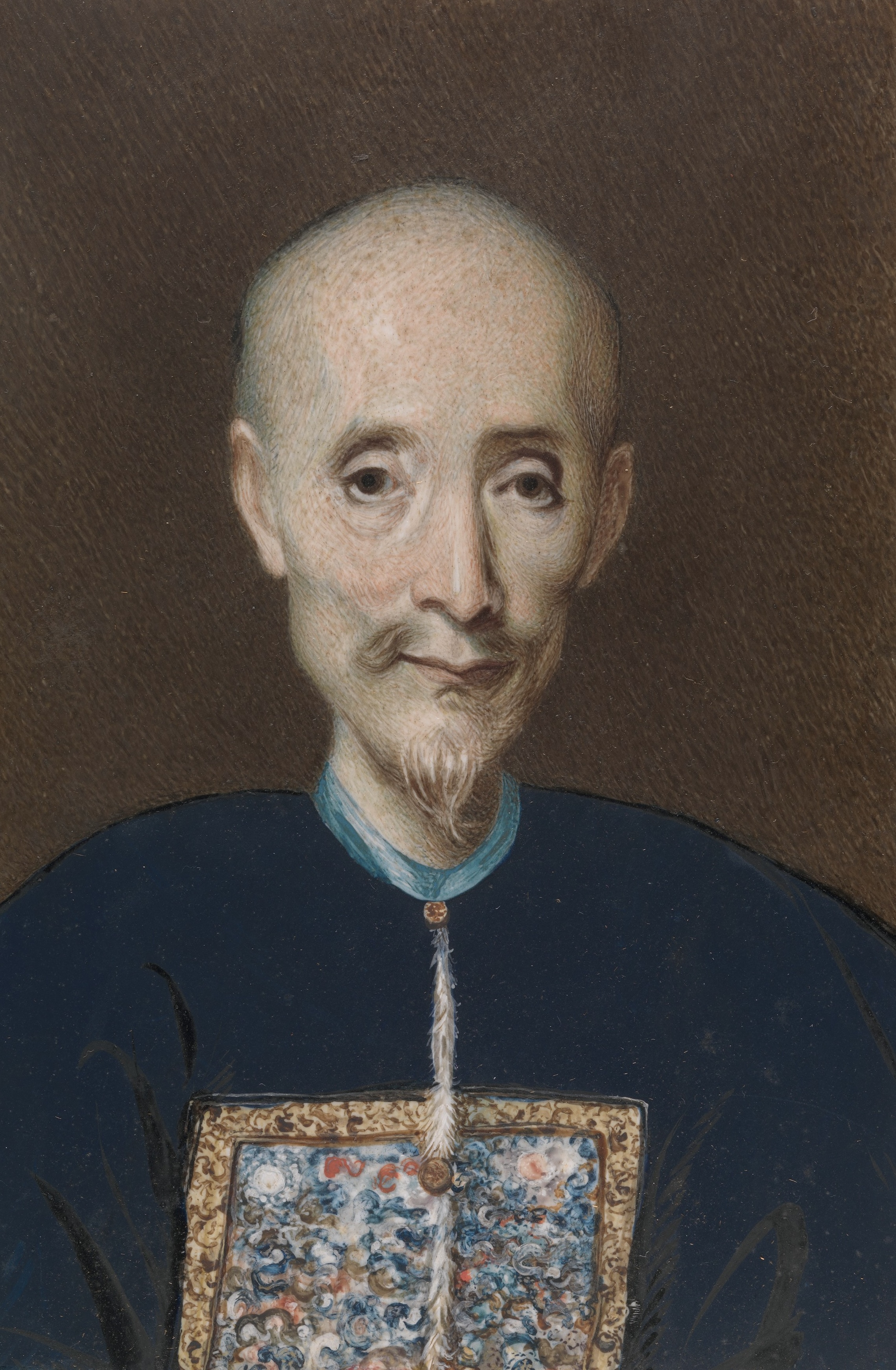
Portrait of Howqua, c. 1840–1849

Perkins & Co., like many other Boston trading firms in the early 19th century, sent ships to China to get tea for sale in America (although some was ultimately re-exported to Britain and Europe). To pay for the tea, they exported to China large quantities of silver and also furs, manufactured goods, cloth, wood, opium and any other items that they thought the Chinese market would absorb.

Active trading houses, particularly those from Boston, usually kept representatives resident in Hong Kong whose main role was to look for and secure quality tea for export at good prices. This was John Murray Forbes' main job during the two years he spent in China. John Murray Forbes' brother, Robert Bennet Forbes, was more intimately involved in the importing side of the business and, at least by their own writings, had a more direct role than did John in the opium trade.

Until recently, the Museum of the American China Trade in Milton, Mass., on Boston's South Shore, was curated by a Forbes great-grandson, Dr. H. A. Crosby Forbes, an expert on Chinese porcelain. In 1992 H. A. Crosby Forbes donated his family's papers, beginning with those of Henry Ashton and Mary (Leavitt) Crosby, to the Massachusetts Historical Society. The museum, which was housed in Robert Bennet Forbes' 1833 Greek Revival style house, was a monument to the China merchants and the great wealth in Boston that both drove and resulted from the China trade. The China trade museum was merged with the Peabody Essex Museum in 1984 leaving the house in the management of the Forbes House Charitable Trust which operates it now as the Captain Forbes House Museum.

Neither John nor Robert spent more than a relatively short time in China—John was there for two years. Upon his return to Boston, John continued his interest in the China trade for a few more years, serving as a business/investment manager for voyages undertaken by Robert and others. Fairly soon, however, he recognized that the China trade was becoming increasingly difficult to pursue profitably and that railroads offered a new and much more lucrative opportunity.

=== Railroad investment ===
Due to the close bond relationship and trust he still maintained in Boston with Howqua, he was given $200,000 of Howqua capital to invest in US business opportunities, to invest on behalf of his Chinese mentor in the US. Deploying this capital in the US, John Murray Forbes made a considerable fortune from investments in railroads from the 1840s onwards. Some of the population growth of Chicago and Midwestern Plains states in the middle to late 19th century was due to John Murray Forbes' railroad projects in Michigan and Chicago. The Chicago, Burlington & Quincy Railroad, from Chicago west to the Mississippi, was built by John Murray Forbes who had a reputation for sound financial management amongst the railroad tycoons of the day.

== Family assets ==
Some Forbes family members remain generally influential in local or national politics.

In the 1840s, John Murray Forbes bought Naushon Island, which is one of the Elizabeth Islands northwest of Martha's Vineyard, Osterville, and within the town of Gosnold, Massachusetts. Forbes and his descendants have used the property as a summer retreat since then. The property is presently owned by a Forbes family corporation, the Naushon Trust, Inc.

== Family members ==
=== Noted as businessmen ===
- Colonel James Grant Forbes (1769–1826), engaged in the West India trade in Port-au-Prince (Haiti), served as an army officer during the War of 1812, went as envoy in 1821 to receive the relinquishment of the Floridas from the Spanish authority in Cuba, Governor of East Florida.
- Grandson of John Forbes, John Murray Forbes (1813–1898), born in France, John Murray Forbes was the first of the family to enter the China trade and later invested in railroads and amassed a large fortune.
- Francis Blackwell Forbes (1839–1908), poppy botanist, wrote a book on Chinese plants, opium trader in the China trade.
- William Hathaway Forbes (1840–1897), son of John Murray Forbes, businessman. Investor in, and later president of, the Bell Telephone Company.
- Francis Murray Forbes (1874–1961), American businessman, son of Francis Blackwell Forbes and wife Isabel Clark. Co-founder of Cabot, Cabot & Forbes.
- James Grant Forbes II (1879–1955), American lawyer, banker and businessman, son of Francis Blackwell Forbes and his wife Isabel Clark. Was born in Shanghai, China, where the Forbes amassed a fortune from the opium trade and merchant banking after the Opium Wars. The grandfather of Brice Lalonde and John Forbes Kerry.
- Another grandson of John Forbes Robert Bennet Forbes (1804–1889), Partner of Russell & Company, and later associated with Yale University development and endowment.

=== Noted as politicians and activists ===
Many Forbes family members are influential in local or national politics in France, the US and the Philippines:

- John Forbes Kerry (born 1943), United States Special Presidential Envoy for Climate from 2021 to 2024, United States Secretary of State 2013–2017, United States Senator 1985–2013 and Democratic party candidate in the 2004 United States presidential election.
- William Cameron Forbes (1870–1959) used his wealth to become Governor General of the Philippines and ambassador to Japan.
- Edward Waldo Forbes (1873–1969) served as the Director of the Fogg Art Museum at Harvard University from 1909 to 1944. Under his leadership, the art collection was vastly expanded, and a new building was constructed in 1927. The Museum Course, run by EWF and Paul J. Sachs revolutionized museology in the United States.
- Brice Lalonde, an environmental activist who is John Forbes Kerry's first cousin and friend. Lalonde is a French Green party politician who was a candidate in the 1981 French presidential election and the mayor of Saint-Briac-sur-Mer near the Forbes family estate in France from 1995 to 2008. He was a high-profile member of the UN and its Special Adviser on Sustainable Development.
- James Colt (1932–2008), a descendant of John Murray Forbes, part-owner of Naushon Island, the Forbes family estate off Falmouth, an attorney specializing in trusts and estates, served as a Massachusetts state representative, a trustee for 30 years, serving as managing trustee for seven.
- Ruth Forbes Young (1903–1998), founder of the International Peace Academy with the purpose of studying UN peacekeeping and developing peacekeeping doctrine, she was married to the inventor and helicopter pioneer Arthur Middleton Young.

=== Other family members ===
The first members of the family to live in the United States was John Forbes, a clergyman, son of Archibald Forbes, although the family retained its connections with Europe and John Murray Forbes was born in France.

- John Murray Forbes (1807–1885), m. to Anne Howell, (d. 1849)
- Rosemary Forbes Kerry (1913–2002), m. to Richard Kerry.
- Elliot Forbes (1917–2006), conductor and musicologist
- John Murray Forbes (1813–1898), an American railroad magnate, merchant, philanthropist and abolitionist, m. to Sarah Swain Hathaway, (1813–1900).
- John Malcolm Forbes (1847–1904), American businessman and sportsman.
- Michael R. Paine (1928–2018), m. to Ruth Hyde Paine (1932–2025), family benefactors who were acquaintances of Lee Harvey Oswald; Ruth housed Marina Oswald in her home.
- William Cameron Forbes (1870–1959), investment banker and diplomat, served as Governor-General of the Philippines from 1908 to 1913.
- China Forbes (born 1970), singer and songwriter, best known as the lead singer of Pink Martini.
- Maya Forbes (born 1968) is an American screenwriter and television producer, sister of China Forbes.
- Ed Droste (born 1978), singer and musician, lead singer of Grizzly Bear, grandson of Elliot Forbes.
- Beatrice Forbes Manz, professor of history at Tufts University
- Amelia Meath (born 1988), singer, musician, and dancer, best known as a singer in Sylvan Esso and Mountain Man (band).

== Family tree ==
Some of the family members include:

- Reverend John Forbes (est. 1740-1783) m. Dorothy Murray
  - James Grant Forbes (1769-1825)
    - John Murray Forbes (1807-1885) m. Anne Howell
      - Francis Blackwell Forbes (1839-1908) m. Isabel Clark (ca. 1846-1931)
        - Francis Murray Forbes (1874-1961)
        - James Grant Forbes II (1879-1955) m. Margaret Tyndal Winthrop
          - Rosemary Forbes m. Richard John Kerry
            - John Kerry(1943-)
          - Fiona Forbes m. Alain Lalonde
            - Brice Lalonde(1946-)
      - John Murray Forbes, Jr. (1844-1921) m. Minnie Emmett Griswold
      - Adelaide Forbes Carmichael
    - Paul Siemen Forbes (1808-1886)
      - William Howell Forbes (1837-1896)
      - Henry De Courcy Forbes (1849-1920)
      - Paul Revere Forbes (1860-1936)
  - Ralph Bennett Forbes m. Margaret Perkins
    - Robert Bennet Forbes (1804-1889) m. Rose Smith
      - Robert Bennet Forbes, Jr. (1837-1891)
      - Edith Forbes (1843-1925) m. Charles Elliott Perkins
      - James Murray Forbes (1845-1937) . Alice Bowditch
    - Thomas Tunno Forbes
    - John Murray Forbes (1813-1898) m. Sarah Hathaway
      - William Hathaway Forbes (1840-1897) m. Edith Emerson (daughter of Ralph Waldo Emerson)
        - Ralph Emerson Forbes (1866-1937) m. Elise Cabot
          - Ruth Forbes Young (1903-1998)
            - Michael Ralph Paine (1928-2018)
        - William Cameron Forbes (1870-1959)
        - Edward Waldo Forbes (1873-1969)
          - Elliot Forbes (1917-2006)
            - Diana Forbes m. Bruce F. Droste
              - Ed Droste (1978-)
        - Alexander Forbes (1882-1965)
          - A. Irving Forbes (1922-2008)
      - John Malcolm Forbes (1847-1904) m. Sarah Coffin Jones (1852-1891)
        - Margaret Forbes (1876-1899) m. Arnold Carl Klebs (1870-1943)
          - Sarah Malcolm Klebs (1899-1957)
        - Gerrit Forbes (1880-1964)
          - Gordon Donald Forbes (1915-1993) m. Faith Fisher (1918-2009)
            - Donald Cameron Forbes (1939-1998) m. Peggy Woodford
              - Maya Forbes (1968-)
              - China Forbes (1970-)
        - Henry Stone Forbes (1882-1968) m. Hildegarde Boughton Cobb (1893-1991)
          - Hildegarde Forbes
          - Elizabeth Candler Forbes
          - Marjorie Forbes
        - Ellen Forbes (1886-1954) m. Waldo Emerson Forbes
        - Amelia Forbes (1888-1979) m. Raymond Emerson
          - Ellen Emerson Cotton 1914-2005
          - David Emerson (1916-1998)
            - William Allen Emerson (1941-1968)
          - Annie Emerson Riggs (1918-1983)
          - Edward Waldo Emerson (1920-2006)
          - William Forbes Emerson (1923-1944)
          - Hope Emerson Sage (1926-1976)

== Network ==
=== Associates ===
The following is a list of figures closely aligned with or subordinate to the Forbes family.

- Charles Pickering Bowditch
- Erastus Corning
- John Perkins Cushing
- Warren Delano Jr.
- Raymond Emerson
- Howqua
- John Cleve Green
- Norman Wait Harris
- Henry Lee Higginson
- Gardiner Greene Hubbard
- James Frederick Joy
- Thomas Lauderdale
- Charles Elliott Perkins
- William Sturgis
- Nathaniel Thayer Jr.

=== Businesses ===
The following is a list of companies in which the Forbes family have held a controlling or otherwise substantial interest.

- Bell Telephone Company
- Burlington & Missouri River Rail Road
- Cabot, Cabot & Forbes
- Chicago, Burlington and Quincy Railroad
- Forbes Lithograph Manufacturing Company
- Hannibal and St. Joseph Railroad
- Harris, Forbes & Co.
- J.M. Forbes & Co.
- Michigan Central Railroad
- National Bank of China
- Russell & Company
- St. Mary's Falls Ship Canal Company
- St. Paul, Minneapolis & Manitoba Railway
- Walter Baker & Company
- Welch & Forbes, LLC

=== Philanthropy & Miscellaneous Non-profit Organizations ===
- Harvard River Associates
- Hong Kong Jockey Club
- International Peace Academy
- Loyal Publication Society
- Manila Polo Club
- Milton Academy
- Nuclear-Disarmament Organization Council for a Livable World
- Sailors' Snug Harbor of Boston
- Union Club of Boston

== Buildings, estates & historic landmarks ==
- Birdwood (Thomasville, Georgia)
- Briar Patch (Sands Point, New York)
- Captain Robert Bennet Forbes House
- Gerry's Point
- Laucala
- Les Essarts
- Naushon Island
- Rosa Hill
- Three Pines

== Sources ==
- Life and Recollections of John Murray Forbes, ed. by Sarah Forbes Hughes, Two Volumes, Houghton, Mifflin & Co., 1899.
- An American Railroad Builder: John Murray Forbes, by Henry Pearson, Houghton, Mifflin & Co., 1911.
- Forbes: Telephone Pioneer, by Arthur Pier, 1953.
- The Bingham Genealogy Project, by Doug Bingham, 2003
- Boston Men on the Northwest Coast: The American Fur Trade, 1788-1844, by Mary Malloy, University of Alaska Press, 1998.
- Bonds of Enterprise: John Murray Forbes and Western Development in America's Railway Age, John Lauritz Larson, Iowa City: University of Iowa Press, 2001.
- Otter Skins, Boston Ships, and China Goods: The Maritime Fur Trade of the Northwest Coast, 1785-1841, by James R. Gibson, McGill-Queen's University Press, 2001.
- Letters from China: The Canton-Boston Correspondence of Robert Bennet Forbes, 1838 – 1840, ed. by Phyllis Forbes Kerr, Mystic Seaport Museum, 1996.
- Barons of the Sea: Race to Build the Fastest Clipper Ship; Simon & Schuster; First Edition (July 17, 2018).
