= Assarting =

Clearing of forested lands for use in agriculture or other purposes

Assarting is the act of clearing forested lands for use in agriculture or other purposes. In English land law, it was illegal to assart any part of a royal forest without permission. This was the greatest trespass that could be committed in a forest, being more than a waste: while waste of the forest involves felling trees and shrubs, which can regrow, assarting involves completely uprooting all trees—the total extirpation of the forested area.

The term assart was also used for a parcel of land assarted. Assart rents were those paid to the British Crown for the forest lands assarted. The etymology is from the French word essarter meaning to remove or grub out woodland. In northern England this is referred to as ridding.

== Process ==
In the Middle Ages, the land cleared was usually common land but after assarting, the space became privately used. The process took several forms. Usually it was done by one farmer who hacked out a clearing from the woodland, leaving a hedged field. However, sometimes groups of individuals or even entire villages did the work and the results were divided into strips and shared among tenant farmers. Monastic communities, particularly the Cistercians, sometimes assarted, as well as local lords. The cleared land often leaves behind an assart hedge, which often contains a high number of woodland trees such as small leafed lime or wild service and contains trees that rarely colonise planted hedges, such as hazel. Examples are in Dorset, where there is a difference in the hedges in the west and the east of the county, at Hatfield Broad Oak in Essex where the modern hedges still follow the boundaries of an ancient forest, and at Shelley in Suffolk where there is an unusually long hedge made up of coppiced lime trees that is the remnant of a nineteenth-century woodland clearance.

== History ==
Assarting has existed since Mesolithic times and often it relieved population pressures. During the 13th century, assarting was very active, but decreased with environmental and economic challenges in the 14th century. The Black Death in the late 1340s depopulated the countryside and many formerly assarted areas returned to woodland.

Assarting was described by landscape historian Richard Muir as typically being "like bites from an apple" as it was usually done on a small scale but large areas were sometimes cleared. Occasionally, people specialized in assarting and acquired the surname or family name of 'Sart'.

Field names in Britain sometimes retain their origin in assarting or colonisation by their names such as: 'Stocks'; 'Stubbings'; 'Stubs'; 'Assart'; 'Sart'; 'Ridding'; 'Royd'; 'Brake'; 'Breach'; or 'Hay'. Many Northern French places called 'Les Essarts' or ending with '-sart' refer to that practice.
