= William Hathaway Forbes =

American businessman (1840–1897)

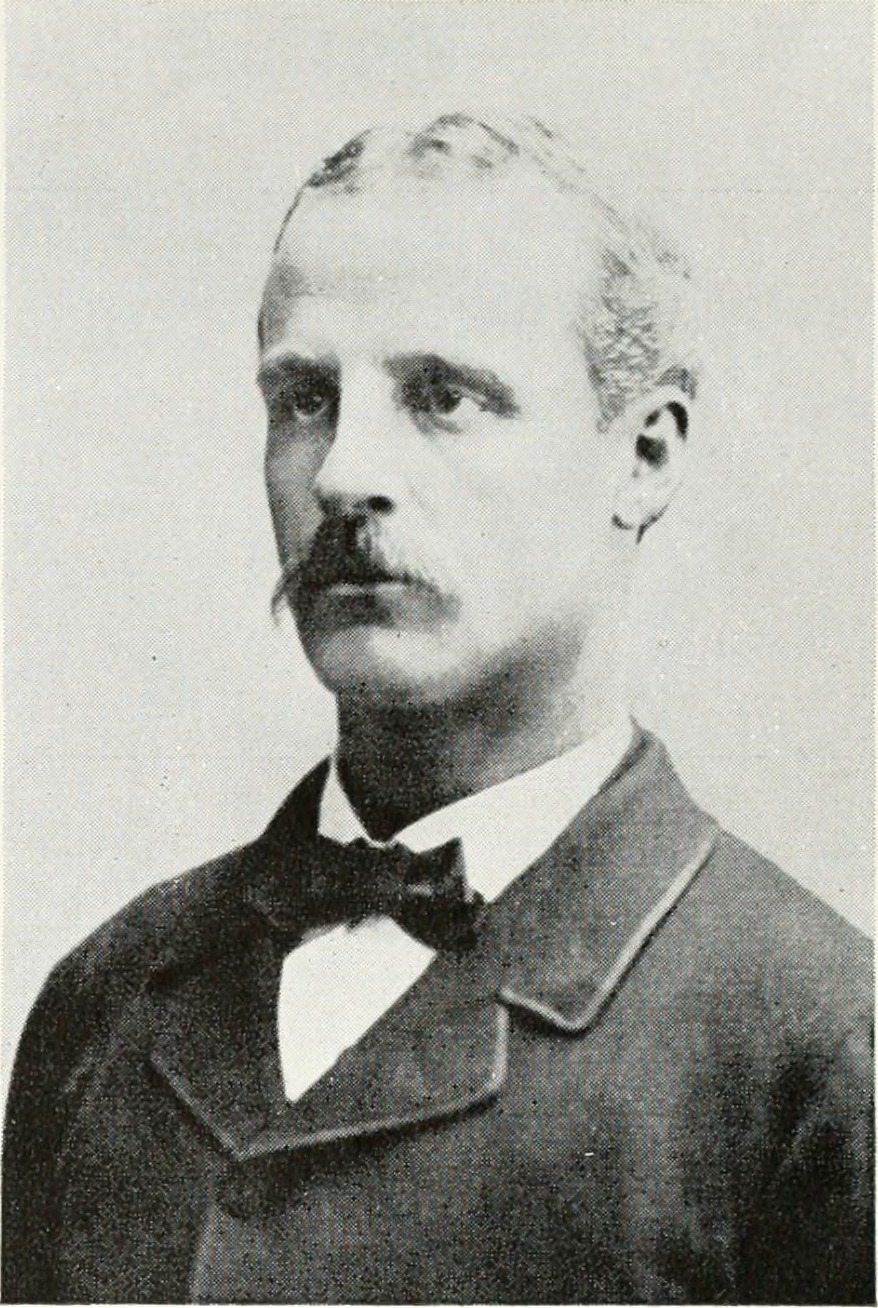
- Born: October 31, 1840; Milton, Massachusetts, U.S.
- Died: October 11, 1897 (aged 56); Naushon Island, Massachusetts, U.S.
- Education: Harvard University
- Spouse: Edith Emerson
- Children: 8 (6 sons and 2 daughters, including William, Edward and Alexander)
- Parent(s): John Murray Forbes; Sarah Hathaway
- Relatives: Ralph Waldo Emerson (father-in-law); John Malcolm Forbes (brother); Ruth Forbes Young (granddaughter)

William Hathaway Forbes (October 31, 1840 – October 11, 1897) was an American businessman. A Union army veteran and Harvard College alum, Forbes invested early in the Bell Telephone Company and served as company president from 1879 to 1887. He was a Boston Brahmin and member of the prominent Forbes family of Boston.

== Early life ==
Forbes was born on October 31, 1840, in Milton, Massachusetts. His father, John Murray Forbes, was a French-born railroad magnate.

Forbes enrolled at Harvard University in 1857, but he was expelled in 1860. During the American Civil War of 1861-1865, he served in the 1st Massachusetts Volunteer Cavalry of the Union Army from 1861 to 1863, and in the 2nd Regiment of Cavalry, Massachusetts Volunteers from 1863 to 1865. He was captured by the Confederate States Army on July 6, 1864, and imprisoned in Charleston and Columbia, South Carolina, until December 1864. He received a Bachelor of Arts degree from Harvard University in 1871.

== Career ==
Forbes started his career at J.M. Forbes & Co., an investment firm founded by his father.

In the later 1870s, Forbes was approached by Gardiner Greene Hubbard and Thomas Sanders to invest in their Bell Telephone Company. Not only did Forbes invest, he encouraged some of his wealthy acquaintances to do so too. Subsequently, Forbes served as the President of the Bell Telephone Company from 1879 to 1887.

== Personal life ==
Forbes married Edith Emerson, the daughter of poet Ralph Waldo Emerson. They had six sons, Ralph Emerson Forbes, W. Cameron Forbes, John Murray Forbes (who died at age 17 of appendicitis), Edward W. Forbes, Waldo Emerson Forbes and Alexander Forbes, and two daughters, Edith Forbes and Ellen Randolph Forbes.

== Death ==
Forbes died on October 11, 1897, on Naushon Island, Massachusetts.

== See also ==
- Telephone in United States history
