= Brice Lalonde =

French politician

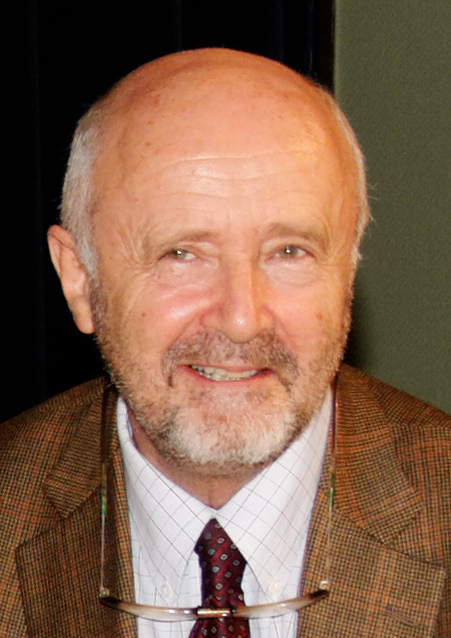

Minister of the Environment
- In office 12 May 1988 – 2 April 1992
- Prime Minister: Michel Rocard; Édith Cresson
- Preceded by: Alain Carignon
- Succeeded by: Segolene Royal

Personal details
- Born: 10 February 1946 (age 80) Neuilly-sur-Seine, France
- Relations: Forbes family
- Parent(s): Alain Lalonde; Fiona Forbes

Brice Lalonde (French pronunciation: [bʁis lalɔ̃d]; born 10 February 1946) is a former green party leader in France, who ran for President of France in the Presidential elections, 1981. In 1988 he was named Minister of the Environment, and in 1990 founded the green Ecology Generation party.

== Life and career ==
Lalonde was born in Neuilly-sur-Seine, Hauts-de-Seine, the son of Alain Lalonde and Fiona Forbes. His maternal grandparents were Americans James Grant Forbes II of the Forbes family and Margaret Tyndal Winthrop of the Dudley–Winthrop family. Through Fiona's sister Rosemary, he is a first cousin of politicians John Kerry and Cameron Kerry. Lalonde's paternal grandfather changed his surname from Lévy to Lalonde, and converted from Judaism to Catholicism. James Grant Forbes II was a poppy botanist and opium dealer in the China trade during the Opium Wars, who wrote a book on Chinese plants.

Lalonde was a student leader during the May 1968 student uprisings in France.

In 1968, Lalonde was a member of Union Nationale des Étudiants de France (UNEF), the French national students' union, and chairman of UNEF-Sorbonne, which brought France to a standstill with protests and riots. Later Lalonde, with David McTaggart, an activist involved in the Greenpeace protests against French nuclear tests at Mururoa atoll, helped create the confrontational strategies of boarding ships at sea in the 1970s. In July 1973, he was arrested by the French Navy during protests against nuclear tests in Mururoa, along with General Jacques Pâris de Bollardière, priest Jean Toulat and writer Jean-Marie Muller.

He was the Mouvement d'écologie politique (MEP) candidate for President of France in 1981 (3.88% of the vote), spokesman for Amis de la Terre in 1982 and later Environment Secretary of France (1988–90) and Environment Minister of France (1990–92). From 1995 to 2008, he was the mayor of Saint-Briac-sur-Mer, a small Breton village where the Forbes family have a villa.

In 1990 Lalonde founded the Ecology Generation party which enjoyed runaway electoral success in 1992 but then declined in face of competition from the French Green Party. He was unable to run for president in the 1995 elections, being unable to obtain the necessary 500 signatures from French mayors or MPs. In 2002, he left the leadership of his party and politics. He became a consultant, working on development projects in Africa.

In 2007 Brice Lalonde was appointed French Ambassador for Climate Change and was heavily involved in multilateral climate change negotiations until the end of 2010, when UN Secretary-General Ban Ki-moon appointed him Assistant Secretary-General, Executive Coordinator of the United Nations Conference on Sustainable Development (Rio+20), which was held in Rio de Janeiro in June 2012.

Lalonde lives in Paris.

== Timeline ==
- 1968 – President of the National Student Union (at the Sorbonne) and leader in the May 1968 student uprisings
- 1971 – Joined and led the recently created French branch of the environmental organization, "Les Amis de la Terre" (Friends of the Earth).
- 1974 – Directed the presidential campaign of ecological politician René Dumont
- 1977 – Founded Radio Verte, a Green radio station
- 1976–1977 – Journalist for Le Sauvage
- 1981 – Ran for President of France on the Green ticket
- 1981 – Member of the National Ecological Commission of the Territorial Planning and Management Ministry
- 1982–1985 – Administrator of the European Bureau of the Environment
- 1986 – Expert on pollution of the Rhine by Sandoz
- 1988–1992 – French Minister of Environment
- 1995–2008 – Mayor of Saint-Briac-sur-Mer
- 1990–2002 – Leader of the Génération Ecologie party.
- 2007–2010 – French ambassador on climate change negotiations.
- 2010–2012 – United Nations Assistant Secretary-General, Executive Coordinator of the United Nations Conference on Sustainable Development (Rio+20).

== Selected publications ==
- "Ecoliberalism Lives". Telos 61 (Fall 1984). New York: Telos Press.
