= William Cameron Forbes =

American diplomat (1870–1959)

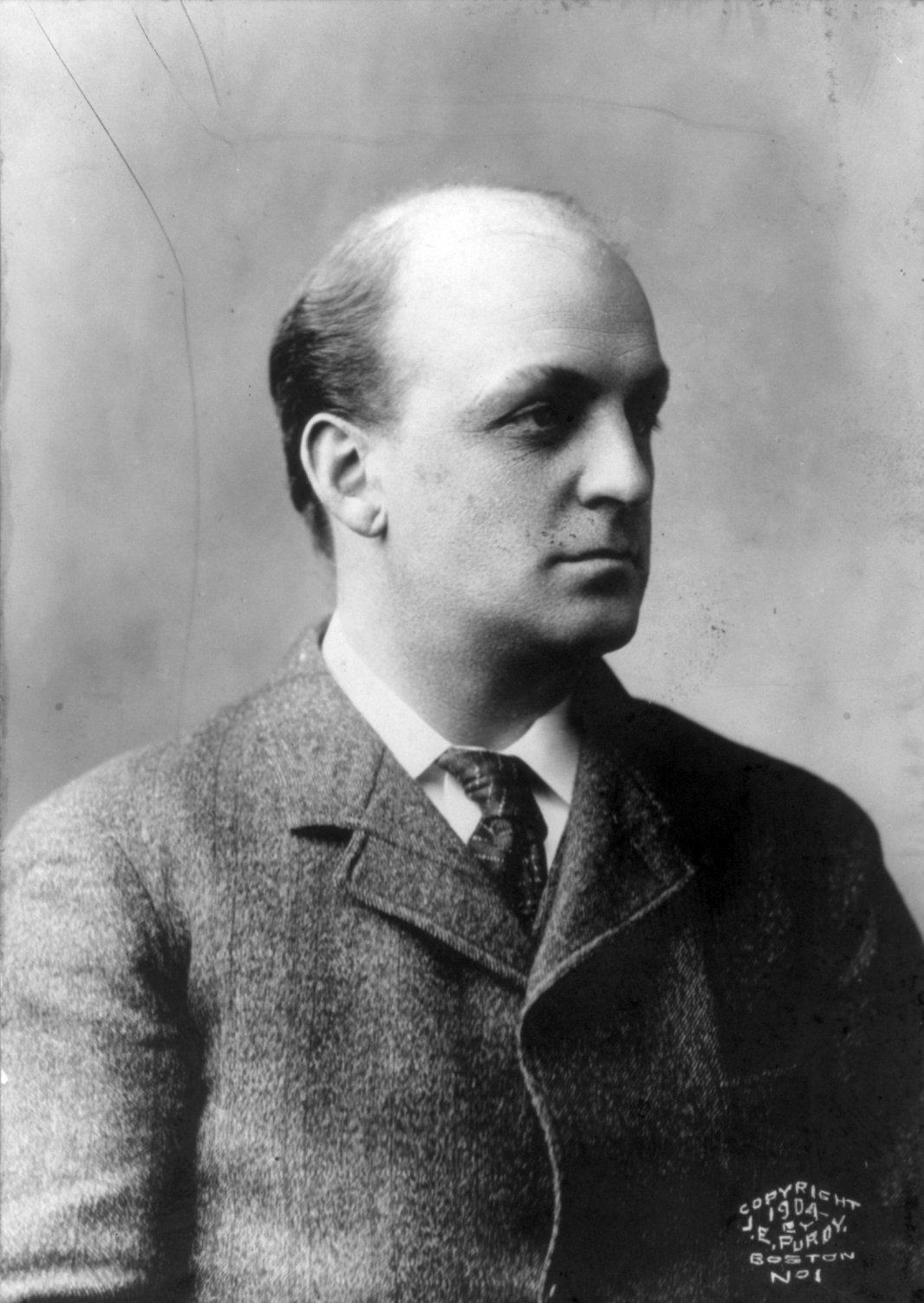
- Forbes, c. 1904

United States Ambassador to Japan
- In office September 15, 1930 – March 22, 1932
- President: Herbert Hoover
- Preceded by: William Castle, Jr.
- Succeeded by: Joseph Grew

Governor General of the Philippines
- In office November 11, 1909 – September 1, 1913
- President: William Howard Taft; Woodrow Wilson
- Preceded by: James Francis Smith
- Succeeded by: Newton W. Gilbert (acting)

Vice Governor-General of the Philippines
- In office July 31, 1908 – November 10, 1909
- Preceded by: Henry Clay Ide
- Succeeded by: Newton W. Gilbert

President of the Philippine Amateur Athletic Federation
- In office 1911–1916
- Preceded by: Position established
- Succeeded by: Manuel L. Quezon

Personal details
- Born: May 21, 1870 Milton, Massachusetts, U.S.
- Died: December 24, 1959 (aged 89) Boston, Massachusetts, U.S.
- Resting place: Milton Cemetery, Milton, Massachusetts, U.S.

William Cameron Forbes (May 21, 1870 – December 24, 1959) was an American investment banker and diplomat. He served as governor-general of the Philippines from 1909 to 1913 and ambassador of the United States to Japan from 1930 to 1932.

== Early life and career ==
William Cameron Forbes, nicknamed "Cam", was the son of William Hathaway Forbes, son of John Murray Forbes and president of the Bell Telephone Company, and Edith Emerson, a daughter of Ralph Waldo Emerson. The Forbes were a Boston Brahmin family which made its original fortune in the Old China Trade. Despite his descent from the greatest American Transcendentalist, Forbes would later distance his business and diplomatic career from his grandfather's work, saying that he "had his line in material affairs."

He was educated at the Milton Academy and Boston's Hopkinson School and graduated from Harvard in 1892. Afterwards, he embarked on a business career, in 1899 becoming a life partner in J. M. Forbes and Company, an investment firm founded by his grandfather. He would return to Harvard in order to coach the Harvard Crimson in 1897 and 1898, in the latter year, the team was undefeated. Forbes was a passionate polo player, even authoring a guide to the sport, As to Polo, during his tenure in the Philippines in 1911. Along with his tenure at J.M. Forbes and Co., Forbes served as director of several companies, including the American Telephone and Telegraph Company, the First National Bank of Boston, Stone & Webster, and United Fruit Company.

== Philippines ==
During the administration of President William Howard Taft, Forbes was Governor-General of the Philippines from 1909 to 1913. Previously, during the administration of President Theodore Roosevelt, he had been Commissioner of Commerce and Police in the American colonial Insular Government of the Philippines from 1904 through 1908; and he was Vice Governor from 1908 through 1909.

Forbes heavily championed the development of the summer capital in Baguio, designed by Daniel Burnham, incorporating a country club and golf course into the urban plans. The project drew criticism from local residents and political figures for its high expenditure during a period of postwar recovery and for physically separating the colonial administration from the public. Consistent with the prevailing American colonial attitudes of the era, Forbes maintained a paternalistic view toward the local population, regarding them as unready for self-government. Although the newly established Baguio Country Club restricted its initial membership almost entirely to Americans, it included a small number of prominent Filipinos, such as future president Manuel L. Quezon. Political tensions between Forbes and Quezon were significant; Quezon later criticized Forbes's governance style by comparing his paternalism to that of former slaveholders. Critics also faulted colonial officials for utilizing the remote summer capital extensively for leisure rather than active administration.

Forbes maintained a deep personal respect for national figures like José Rizal, whom he explicitly referred to as a "martyrized uncle" in his private writings. Far from maintaining strict social isolation, Forbes actively welcomed elite Filipino families into his social circle. This included decades-long interactions with Rizal's niece, Adela Hidalgo Ver—the daughter of Saturnina Hidalgo—who assisted in hosting major diplomatic receptions for visiting U.S. dignitaries, and later requested Forbes to serve as godfather to her son, Bernadino Ver.

Forbes, who was a polo enthusiast, founded the Manila Polo Club in 1919 in Pasay, Rizal. It was the first polo field in the Philippines. Forbes had envisioned the club as a venue for polo and leisure for "gentlemen of a certain class" assigned to work in the Philippines like himself. He served as delegate of the club until the outbreak of World War II. The clubhouse was inaugurated on November 27, 1909.

In 1921, President Warren G. Harding sent Forbes and Leonard Wood as heads of the Wood-Forbes Commission to investigate conditions in the Philippines. The Commission concluded that Filipinos were not yet ready for independence from the United States, a finding that was widely criticized in the Philippines.

The gated community of Forbes Park in Makati, was named after him; and this community is the residence of some of the wealthiest people in the country. Lacson Avenue (formerly Gov. Forbes Street) in Sampaloc, Manila is still called "Forbes" by some up to the present day.

== Haiti ==
Forbes was appointed by President Herbert Hoover in 1930 to lead a commission charged with investigating the reasons for ongoing minor rebellions in Haiti. Forbes gave Hoover a plan to stabilize Haiti and remove the US Marines. An agreement in August 1931 started the withdrawal and a similar plan led to Hoover's withdrawal of troops from Nicaragua. Franklin Roosevelt later completed the process, calling it the "Good Neighbor policy."

== Japan ==
Forbes was nominated by President Hoover and confirmed as United States Ambassador to Japan. He served from 1930 to 1932. He was reluctant to enter the post, and during his tenure frequently clashed with Henry Stimson as militarism became a dominant ideology in Japan.

In early personal correspondence, Forbes identified himself as a "fish out of water" at the Embassy in Tokyo. As the first ambassador to occupy a newly built embassy compound that was completed in 1931, he faulted the ambassador's residence for its shortage of bedrooms and baths and complained to architect Antonin Raymond that, as a polo enthusiast, "he could not bring his horse into the living room to show his guests, as he was accustomed to do in his establishment in the United States." In his first year as ambassador, he spent much time travelling through Asia and pursuing leisure activities. However, the Mukden Incident forced him to return to his diplomatic responsibilities. Forbes frequently deprecated protestations sent by Secretary Stimson and other elements critical of Japan's actions, seeking to ensure stability in the US-Japan relationship. In the face of militarist ascendance following the 1932 general election, he was still reluctant to lodge complaints not backed by real force. Nonetheless, he "castigated" Japan's withdrawal from the League of Nations during the Manchurian Crisis, due to his belief that Japan's unilateral action might have generated less uproar if it had acknowledged certain League guidelines.

Personal financial pressures resulting from the Great Depression and failing health resulted in his resignation in March 1932. Shortly after his resignation, he told a close friend that his "principal stunt" as ambassador had been "trying to keep the United States from being too insistent upon checking Japan". Although Forbes' short, quiescent tenure in Japan has been identified by some as absent-minded, others have characterized it as characteristic of not-yet-formalized realist principles.

In 1935, Forbes headed an American Economic Mission to Japan and China to promote good business relations. In 1935, Forbes met with the Japanese Minister of Commerce and Industry, Machida Chūji, to renegotiate agreements that would improve commercial relations between the two nations.

== Friendship with George Santayana ==
W. Cameron Forbes was a life-long friend of George Santayana, who was a young professor at Harvard during Forbes's last three undergraduate years there. Forbes was one of the models for the protagonist Oliver Arden in Santayana's novel The Last Puritan.

Santayana was a frequent guest at Naushon, an island in Buzzard's Bay, Cape Cod, that belonged to Cam's grandfather, John Murray Forbes, and at the family estate in Milton, Massachusetts ...

== Later years ==
Forbes received LL.D.s from Harvard in 1912, Trinity College in 1924, and Bates College in 1932. He was on the Board of Trustees of Carnegie Institution of Washington and a Life Member of the Corporation at the Massachusetts Institute of Technology. He was on the original standing committee of the Foundation for the Study of Cycles from 1941. He was a member of clubs including Boston's Saturday Club, Union Club, and Harvard Club and New York's Yacht Club and Harvard Club. He died unmarried at the Hotel Vendome in Boston in 1959.

His seasonal home Birdwood, a mansion built in the 1930s for him in southern Georgia, is listed on the National Register of Historic Places.

== Head coaching record ==
Year	Team	Overall	Conference	Standing	Bowl/playoffs
Harvard Crimson (Independent) (1897–1898)
1897	Harvard	10–1–1			
1898	Harvard	11–0			
Harvard:		21–1–1			
Total:		21–1–1			
National championship Conference title Conference division title or championship game berth

== Sources ==
Forbes' papers are in the Houghton Library at Harvard University. Copies of his annotated journal are at the Library of Congress and the Massachusetts Historical Society, Boston. The report of the Forbes Commission's Haitian analysis is at the Library of Congress.

Philippine administrator:

- Peter W. Stanley, A Nation in the Making: The Philippines and the United States, 1899–1921 (1974)
- Rev. Camillus Gott, "William Cameron Forbes and the Philippines, 1904–1946" (Ph.D. diss., Indiana University, 1974)
- Theodore Friend, Between Two Empires: The Ordeal of the Philippines, 1929–1946 (1965).

Ambassador to Japan:

- Gary Ross, "W. Cameron Forbes: The Diplomacy of a Darwinist," in R. D. Burns and E. M. Bennett, eds., Diplomats in Crisis (1974).
- Robert H. Ferrell, American Diplomacy in the Great Depression: Hoover-Stimson Foreign Policy, 1929–1933 (1957)
- Armin Rappaport, Henry L. Stimson and Japan, 1931–1933 (1963)
- James B. Crowley, Japan's Quest for Autonomy (1966).

=== Selected works ===
Forbes wrote the following books and articles:

- 1911 – "As to Polo", Dedham Polo and Country Club.
- 1921 – The Romance of Business
- 1928 – The Philippine Islands, vol. 1, vol. 2
- 1935 – Fuddlehead by Fuddlehead (autobiography) the Massachusetts Historical Society, Boston.
- 1936 – "A Survey of Developments in the Philippine Movement for Independence," Proceedings of the Massachusetts Historical Society, 1932–1936.
- 1939 – "American Policies in the Far East," Proceedings of the American Academy of Arts and Sciences (January 1939).

== See also ==
- Iwahig Prison and Penal Farm

Government offices
Preceded by Newton W. Gilbert	Governor-General of the Philippines; 1909–1913	Succeeded by Francis Burton Harrison
Olympic Games
New title	President of the Philippine Amateur Athletic Federation; 1911–1916	Succeeded by Manuel L. Quezon
Diplomatic posts
Preceded by William Castle, Jr.	U.S. Ambassador to Japan; 1930–1932	Succeeded by Joseph Grew
