= Carl E. Pickhardt Jr. =

American painter

Carl Emile Pickhardt, Jr.
- Born: 1908; Westwood, Massachusetts, U.S.
- Died: 2004 (aged 95–96)
- Education: Harvard University
- Spouse: Rosamond Forbes

Carl E. Pickhardt Jr. (1908-2004) was an American Social Realist painter and printmaker.

He was born in Westwood, Massachusetts, in 1908 and grew up in West Newton, Massachusetts. He attended the Boston Latin School and Harvard University, graduating in 1931. He studied art under Harold K. Zimmerman, who also tutored Jack Levine and Hyman Bloom.

In his paintings and prints of the 1930s and 40s, Pickhardt often depicted working-class city dwellers such as newsboys, butchers, and washerwomen. In 1942 he was awarded the Shope Prize by the Society of American Etchers at the National Academy of Design. He exhibited at the Institute of Contemporary Art, the 1952 International Exhibition in Japan, the 1966 American Drawing Biennial in Norfolk, Virginia, the Berkshire Museum, and other venues in Boston and New York.

Pickhardt moved to New York City in 1940 but eventually moved back to Boston where he met his wife, Rosamond Forbes, daughter of Fogg Museum director Edward W. Forbes. He taught at the Worcester Museum School, Fitchburg Art Museum, and Sturbridge Art School.

Carl Pickhardt's first “Free Form” paintings pioneered the use of the shaped canvas and called for a new pictorial structure without horizontal or vertical reference. Referring to his paintings as “sculptural,” or “abstractions in new shapes,” Pickhardt fractured the space of traditional painting and paralleled the research of modern mathematicians. Pickhardt first introduced his Free Form paintings in 1953, seven years before Frank Stella's first experimentation with “deductive” pictorial structure, and nine years before Kenneth Noland's lozenge shaped chevron paintings. Like Hans Arp before him, Pickhardt derived pictorial structure from the physical character of the picture support itself. Each painting may be revolved a turntable, appearing in any position around the axes fixing their centers to the wall. As suggested by art historian Parker Tyler, “each outline quivers, expands and contracts, the way the heard does in a human body, sending out waves of energy.”¹ Unconstrained by the traditional boundaries of a rectangular frame, Pickhardt's spontaneous paintings “combine the cerebral and the intuitive, with a critical independence and a controlled passion and intensity in his forms and shapes.”²

His works are included in the permanent collections of the New York Public Library, the Addison Gallery of American Art, the Philadelphia Museum of Art, Harvard University's Fogg Museum, the Boston Museum of Fine Arts, the Brooklyn Museum, the Library of Congress, and the Museum of Modern Art. His papers are on file with the Archives of American Art.

== See also ==
- Boston Expressionism
