= Les Essarts-lès-Sézanne =

- Commune
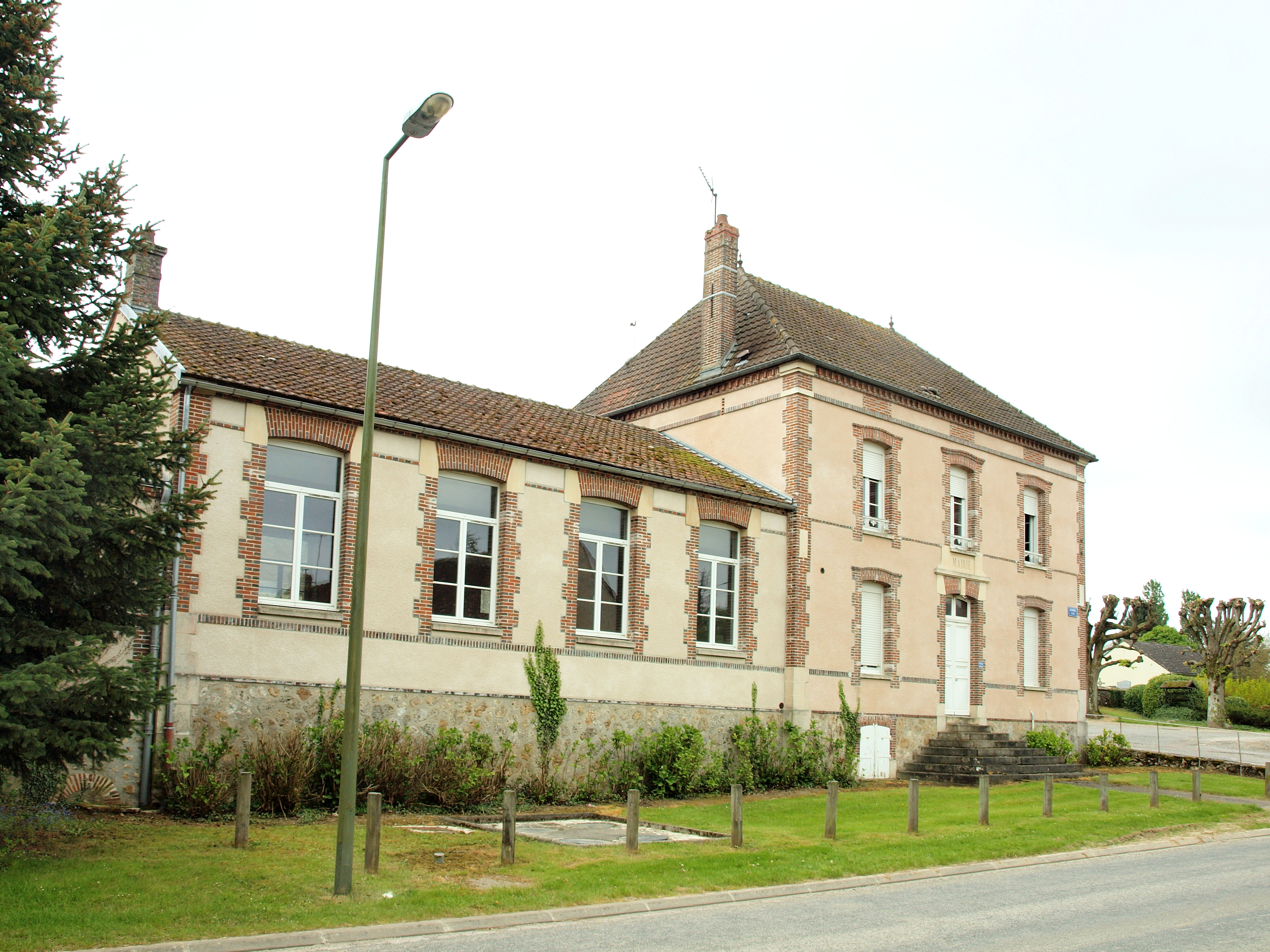
- The town hall in Les Essarts-lès-Sézanne
- Location of Les Essarts-lès-Sézanne
- Location within France Location within Grand Est
- Coordinates: 48°45′13″N 3°39′09″E
- Country: France
- Region: Grand Est
- Department: Marne
- Arrondissement: Épernay
- Canton: Sézanne-Brie et Champagne
- Intercommunality: Sézanne-Sud Ouest Marnais

Government
  - Mayor (2020–2026): Annick Lasseaux
- Area^{1}: 16.79 km^{2} (6.48 sq mi)
- Elevation: 200 m (660 ft)
- Population (2023): 247
  - Density: 14.7/km^{2} (38.1/sq mi)
- Time zone: UTC+01:00 (CET)
  - Summer (DST): UTC+02:00 (CEST)
- INSEE/Postal code: 51235 /51120
- ^{1} French Land Register data, which excludes lakes, ponds, glaciers > 1 km^{2} (0.386 sq mi or 247 acres) and river estuaries.

Les Essarts-lès-Sézanne (French pronunciation: [lez‿esaʁ lɛ sezan], literally Les Essarts near Sézanne) is a commune in the Marne department in north-eastern France.

== See also ==
- Communes of the Marne department
