= Les Essards =

Les Essards may refer to the following communes in France:

- Les Essards, Charente, in the Charente département
- Les Essards, Charente-Maritime, in the Charente-Maritime département
- Les Essards, Indre-et-Loire, in the Indre-et-Loire département
- Les Essards-Taignevaux, in the Jura département

== See also ==
- Les Essarts (disambiguation)
