= Francis Blackwell Forbes =

American botanist

- Born: August 11, 1839; New York City, New York, U.S.
- Died: May 21, 1908 (aged 68); Boston, Massachusetts, U.S.
- Education: Columbia Grammar & Preparatory School
- Occupation: Botanist
- Spouse: Isabel Clark (m. 1867)
- Children: 5
- Parent(s): John Murray Forbes; Anne Howell
- Relatives: Forbes family

Francis Blackwell Forbes (August 11, 1839 – May 21, 1908) was an American botanist with expertise in Chinese seed-producing plants who also worked as a merchant and opium trader in Asia.

== Early life ==
Francis Blackwell Forbes was born in New York on August 11, 1839, one of three children of the Reverend John Murray Forbes, rector of St. Luke's, New York, and his wife Anne Howell. Forbes was a cousin of John Murray Forbes and is a maternal great-grandfather of 2004 U.S. presidential candidate John Kerry. The Forbes family actively engaged in the opium trade and in the Old China Trade during the First and Second Opium Wars, amassing a large fortune.

Forbes was educated at Columbia Grammar & Preparatory School in New York.

== Career ==
After Columbia, Forbes went to China and became a partner in Russell & Co., a firm that was dominant in Far Eastern commerce in the 19th century. He was also associated with the Shanghai Steam Navigation Company, which had a fleet of flat-bottomed steamers on the Yangtze River, and he was for many years the Swedish and Norwegian Consul-General at Shanghai. In recognition of the latter undertaking, he was made a Knight Commander of the Swedish Royal Order of Wasa. Apart from a two-year stay in Europe in 1875–76, Forbes lived in China from 1857 to 1882.

In 1882, Forbes moved to England, where he was managing director of the Serrell Automatic Silk Reeling Company, which failed in 1894. He then retired to Boston.

=== Botany ===
Due in part to his family's deep involvement with the opium trade, Forbes developed a lifelong interest in the poppy and other plants. In the early 1870s, he took up serious plant collecting and eventually became a leading specialist in Chinese botany. He was president of the Shanghai branch of the Royal Asiatic Society in 1874, and he published in the Journal of Botany British and Foreign. After moving to England in the 1880s, he worked on cataloguing the Chinese specimens at Kew Gardens and the British Museum. This led to his capstone work, the multi-volume survey An Enumeration of All the Plants Known from China Proper, Formosa, Hainan, Corea, the Luchu Archipelago, and the Island of Hongkong. His coauthor was the British botanist William Hemsley (who is said to have done the bulk of the work on the later stages of the project, owing to Forbes's time being limited by outside business commitments), and the illustrations were by Matilda Smith. Forbes and Hemsley were the first to describe a number of Chinese species in this work. It met with lavish praise from such contemporary experts on Asian flora as Karl Maximovich and Ferdinand von Richthofen.

This monumental project was inaugurated by Kew Gardens director William Turner Thiselton-Dyer after he noticed, in the 1870s, that while there were two very good catalogues of Chinese flora, they covered mainly the areas around Beijing and Hong Kong, leaving enormous areas of China about whose vegetation nothing scientific had yet been written. He requested that the Royal Society look into preparing a comprehensive report on Chinese flora—including an accounting of specimens already in British herbaria—and the Royal Society eventually funded Forbes's and Hemsley's survey, including its publication in the Journal of the Linnean Society. The first parts were published in 1886, and copies were freely circulated among English residents in China, some of whom—such as Augustine Henry—contributed specimens that were written up in later volumes. Subsequent parts came out in the journal in the years 1887–1905. By the time the last volumes were published, the collection of Chinese plant species in Kew Gardens had more than quadrupled, topping 12,000 species.

Henry Fletcher Hance named the species Euonymus forbesii after Forbes.

== Personal life ==
On May 8, 1867, Forbes married Isabel Clark (ca. 1846–1931), the daughter of William Mather Clark, a banker, and Isabella Staples. They had five children: Francis, William, James, Evelyn and Isobel.

Forbes died in Boston, Massachusetts, on May 21, 1908, survived by his wife, who died in 1931.

=== Legacy ===
Forbes donated his herbarium of over 4000 specimens—mostly Chinese spermatophytes—to the British Natural History Museum around 1904, a gift that the museum termed "a collection of special importance". The Massachusetts Historical Society (MHS) holds documents pertaining to his plant-collecting activities, including botanical notebooks for the years 1869–1880s. Papers relating to his commercial activities are held by the MHS as well as by the Baker Library at Harvard Business School.
