= William Hemsley (botanist) =

British botanist (1843–1924)

William Botting Hemsley (29 December 1843, in East Hoathly – 7 October 1924, in Kent) was an English botanist and 1909 Victoria Medal of Honour recipient. The standard author abbreviation Hemsl. is used to indicate this person as the author when citing a botanical name.

He was born in East Hoathly, Sussex, and in 1860 started work at the Royal Botanic Gardens, Kew as an Improver, then Assistant for India in the Herbarium, finally Keeper of Herbarium and Library. He wrote a number of botanical works.

In 1888, a genus of flowering plants from south-east Asia, belonging to the family Cucurbitaceae was named Hemsleya in his honour.

He was elected a Fellow of the Royal Society in June 1889.

== Publications ==
- William Botting Hemsley (1873). Handbook of Hardy Trees, Shrubs, and Herbaceous Plants: Based on the French Work of Messrs. Decaisne and Naudin Entitled 'Manuel de L'amateur Des Jardins,' and Including the Original Woodcuts by Riocreux and Leblanc. Estes & Lauriat.
- Biologica Centrali-Americana Botany. Vol. I , 1879–1888
- Biologica Centrali-Americana Botany. Vol. III, 1882–1886
- Botany of the Bermudas and various other Islands of the Atlantic and Southern Oceans, 1885
- Botany of Juan Fernandez, South-eastern Molluccas, and the Admiralty Islands, 1885
- An Enumeration of All the Plants Known from China Proper, Formosa, Hainan, Corea, the Luchu Archipelago, and the Island of Hong Kong. with Francis B. Forbes, 1887
