= Bourbriac =

Bourbriac Boulvriag
- Commune
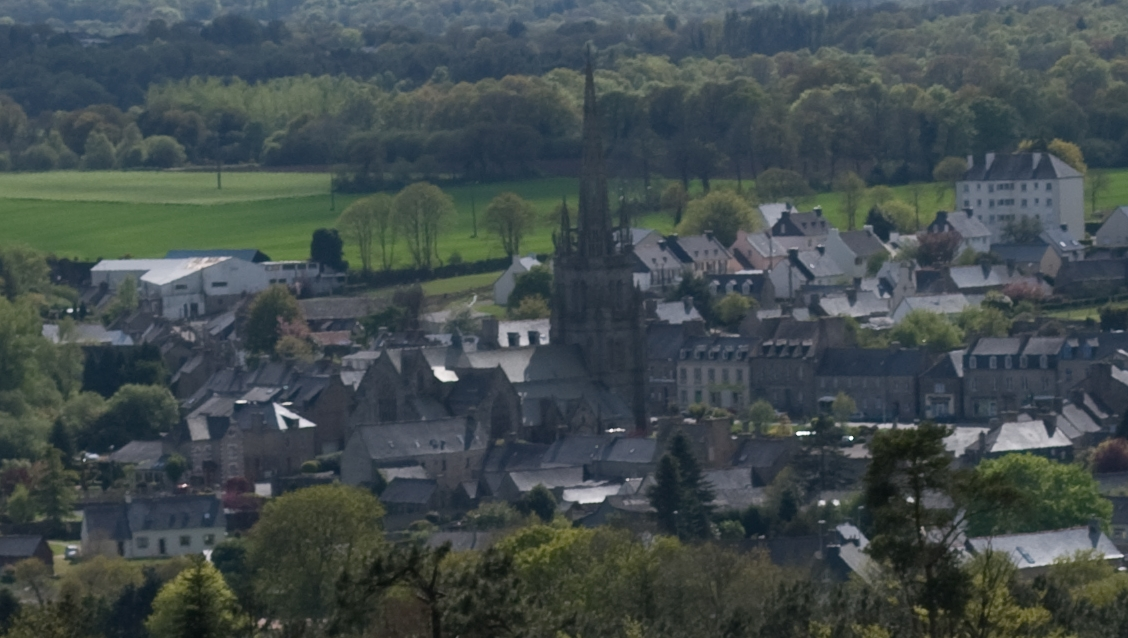
- The town centre of Bourbriac

- Coat of arms
- Location of Bourbriac
- Location within France Location within Brittany
- Coordinates: 48°28′26″N 3°11′14″W
- Country: France
- Region: Brittany
- Department: Côtes-d'Armor
- Arrondissement: Guingamp
- Canton: Callac
- Intercommunality: Guingamp-Paimpol Agglomération

Government
  - Mayor (2020–2026): Claudine Guillou
- Area^{1}: 71.86 km^{2} (27.75 sq mi)
- Highest elevation: 308 m (1,010 ft)
- Lowest elevation: 111 m (364 ft)
- Population (2023): 2,145
  - Density: 29.85/km^{2} (77.31/sq mi)
- Time zone: UTC+01:00 (CET)
  - Summer (DST): UTC+02:00 (CEST)
- INSEE/Postal code: 22013 /22390
- ^{1} French Land Register data, which excludes lakes, ponds, glaciers > 1 km^{2} (0.386 sq mi or 247 acres) and river estuaries.

Bourbriac (French pronunciation: [buʁbʁijak]; Breton: Boulvriag; Gallo: Bólbriac) is a commune in the Côtes-d'Armor department of Brittany in northwestern France.

== Population ==
Inhabitants of Bourbriac are called in French Briacins.

Historical population

Year	Pop.	±% p.a.
1793	3,048	—
1800	2,977	−0.34%
1806	3,096	+0.66%
1821	3,398	+0.62%
1831	3,613	+0.62%
1836	3,825	+1.15%
1841	4,111	+1.45%
1846	4,282	+0.82%
1851	4,533	+1.15%
1856	4,205	−1.49%
1861	4,190	−0.07%
1866	4,421	+1.08%
1872	4,454	+0.12%
1876	4,509	+0.31%
1881	4,337	−0.77%
1886	4,346	+0.04%
1891	4,188	−0.74%
1896	4,087	−0.49%
1901	4,134	+0.23%

Year	Pop.	±% p.a.
1906	4,326	+0.91%
1911	4,306	−0.09%
1921	3,696	−1.52%
1926	4,059	+1.89%
1931	3,801	−1.30%
1936	3,565	−1.27%
1946	3,354	−0.61%
1954	3,049	−1.18%
1962	2,837	−0.90%
1968	2,663	−1.05%
1975	2,458	−1.14%
1982	2,294	−0.98%
1990	2,293	−0.01%
1999	2,299	+0.03%
2007	2,352	+0.29%
2012	2,354	+0.02%
2017	2,271	−0.72%
2023	2,145	−0.95%

Source: EHESS and INSEE (1968-2023)

== Breton language ==
In 2007, 9.7% of primary school children attended bilingual schools. In 2008, 9.09% of primary school children attended bilingual schools.

== See also ==
- Communes of the Côtes-d'Armor department
