= Les Essarts, Forbes family estate =

Estate in France

Coordinates: 48.627°N 2.148°W

Les Essarts is the Forbes family estate at Saint-Briac, France, and the international family seat of the descendants of James Grant Forbes (b. Shanghai, China), a member of the Forbes family of China and Boston who settled in Brittany at Les Essarts. He is the grandfather of two famous politicians, Brice Lalonde, a Green Party candidate for President of France in 1981, and former US secretary of state John Kerry, the Democratic nominee for President of the United States in 2004. Many of the Forbes family have socialized during summers spent in Brittany at Les Essarts.

Les Essarts had been occupied and used as a Nazi headquarters during World War II. When the Germans fled, they bombed Les Essarts and burnt it down. The sprawling estate was rebuilt in 1954.
