= Alexander Forbes (neurophysiologist) =

Professor of physiology

- Born: May 14, 1882; Milton, Massachusetts
- Died: March 27, 1965 (aged 82); Milton, Massachusetts
- Parent(s): William Hathaway Forbes; Edith Emerson Forbes

Alexander Forbes (May 14, 1882 – March 27, 1965) was an American electrophysiologist, neurophysiologist, and professor of physiology at Harvard Medical School. He "had an enormous impact on the physiology and neuroscience of the twentieth century."

== Early life ==
Born into the Boston Brahmin upper class Forbes family, Alexander Forbes's father was William Hathaway Forbes and his mother was Edith Emerson Forbes, the daughter of Ralph Waldo Emerson. From 1889 to 1899 Alexander Forbes attended Milton Academy. There he particularly liked the physics and advanced Greek taught by James Hattrick Lee. For the academic year 1899–1900, Forbes did not pursue formal education but spent time on the Forbes family's Wyoming cattle ranch, camped in the Bighorn Mountains, worked briefly in a Maine electro-chemical mill, and traveled in the Pacific Coast states until the beginning of summer 1900; during that summer he visited "Switzerland, France, Holland, England, and Scotland."

In the autumn of 1900 he matriculated at Harvard College, where he graduated in 1904 with an A.B. As an undergraduate student, he joined several clubs, including the Institute of 1770, the Hasty Pudding Theatricals, the Signet Society, and Delta Phi. For the academic year 1904–1905, he was a graduate student in zoology, learning rudimentary electrophysiology under the supervision of George Howard Parker. After receiving his A.M. degree in 1905, Forbes spent another year away from formal education. He and one of his brothers camped in a cabin on the shore of Wyoming's Lake Solitude. They chopped wood, hunted elk, and studied books on chemistry and astronomy.

From 1906 to 1910 he studied medicine at Harvard Medical School. During those years he was the coauthor of a paper with William Ernest Castle, the coauthor of a paper with Lawrence Joseph Henderson, and the author of two papers without a coauthor. In 1910 Forbes received his M.D. degree.

He never became a medical intern and was never licensed to practice medicine. For the academic year 1911–1912 on an academic leave of absence, he studied under Charles Sherrington at the University of Liverpool and for a brief time under Keith Lucas at the University of Cambridge. In 1912 Forbes returned to Harvard Medical School with "new ideas, new techniques, and new equipment."

== Career ==
In Harvard Medical School's Department of Physiology, Forbes was an instructor from 1910 to 1921, an associate professor from 1921 to 1936, and a full professor from 1936 to 1948, retiring as professor emeritus in 1948.

The two 1915 papers by Forbes and Gregg "were landmarks, because for the first time there was the skilled application of electrical recording to central reflex phenomena." In 1920 he, with Catharine Thacher, used the Einthoven string galvanometer to record the first scientific application of an electron-tube amplifier in nerve physiology. Forbes's most influential paper is perhaps The interpretation of spinal reflexes in terms of present knowledge of nerve conduction (1922), which had many suggestions for experimental tests and goals in neurophysiology. Hallowell Davis, Forbes's main collaborator over many years, wrote in his 1949 paper The Forbes "School" of neurophysiology at Harvard that Forbes's 1922 paper on the interpretation of spinal reflexes is "one of the foundations of the new science of cybernetics."

In the summer of 1923, Forbes worked with Edgar Douglas Adrian at the University of Cambridge and occasionally visited Oxford to consult with Sherrington and to take lessons in piloting an airplane. Forbes and Birdsey Renshaw (1911–1948) were among the first scientists to use microelectrodes to investigate the mammalian brain.

Forbes was the author or coauthor of over 100 scientific papers. (In addition to his scientific papers and his novel Radio Gunner he wrote a literary memoir entitled Quest for a Northern Air Route and several short stories.) He did research on electrodermal activity, excitatory and inhibitory spinal reflexes, afferent impulses in the nervous system, cerebrocortical activity, and electrophysiological techniques applied to nerve conduction.

== Military service ==
During WW I he was on academic leave of absence from 1917 to 1919 for service in the U.S. Navy. For two months he was a lieutenant (j.g.) on a small patrol boat. He was then appointed a radio officer aboard the scout cruiser USS Salem (CL-3). In February 1918 he was assigned to radio compass duty aboard a destroyer. His work with the electronic equipment stimulated him to write a book Radio Gunner (1924, Houghton Mifflin). The book was published anonymously and gave a fictitious account of a young physicist in an imaginary world war of the future. The imaginary world war described was "remarkably similar to ... World War II". When the USA entered WW II, he went on academic leave from 1942 to 1946. At age 58 he returned to U.S. Navy as a lieutenant commander. After a variety of duties, he worked in the Hydrographic Office in Washington, D.C. until the end of WW II. He was promoted to commander in 1943 and to captain in 1945. In 1946 he was sent on the Operation Crossroads mission to map and measure the waves generated by the atomic bomb explosion on Bikini Atoll. Later in 1946, he returned to his professorship at Harvard Medical School.

== Awards and honors ==
Forbes was elected in 1910 as a member of the American Physiological Society and served as the society's treasurer from 1927 to 1937. He was elected in 1921 a fellow of the American Association for the Advancement of Science and in 1928 a fellow of the American Physical Society. He was elected in 1931 a member of the American Philosophical Society and in 1936 a member of the United States National Academy of Sciences. He was awarded in 1938 the Charles P. Daly Medal. He received in 1952 an honorary S.D. degree from Tufts College and in 1953 an honorary D.Sc. degree from Johns Hopkins University.

== Personal life ==
In 1910 Forbes married Charlotte Irving Grinnell (1884–1982).

In the summer of 1931, Forbes, the owner and captain of the 97-foot schooner Ramah, took a crew of sixteen, including a geologist and botanist on a scientific expedition along the coast of Labrador north to Cape Chidley. The expedition had two airplanes for aerial reconnaissance and photography using the new technique developed by Osborn Maitland Miller for making charts from oblique photographs from airplanes in combination with precise ground markers. The expedition, known as the Forbes–Grenfell expedition, compiled valuable maps of the coast of Labrador. Sir Wilfred Grenfell was the ship's doctor. In 1935 Forbes, as a relief pilot and photographer, accompanied only by a pilot who was also a skilled mechanic, made an eleven-day aerial expedition to photograph the region near Cape Chidley.

Until extreme old age, Forbes engaged in snow skiing, horseback riding, ice skating, sailing, canoeing, kayaking, camping, and flying his private airplane. He continued to attend scientific meetings until the last year of his life.

Upon his death in 1965, he was survived by his widow, a son, three daughters, and ten grandchildren.

== Selected publications ==
=== Articles ===
- Forbes, Alexander; Gregg, Alan (1915). "Electrical Studies in Mammalian Reflexes. Part I. The Flexion Reflex". American Journal of Physiology. Legacy Content. 37 (1): 118–176. doi:10.1152/ajplegacy.1915.37.1.118.
- ——; Gregg, Alan (1915). "Electrical Studies in Mammalian Reflexes. Part II. The Correlation between Strength of Stimuli and the Direct and Reflex Nerve Response". American Journal of Physiology. Legacy Content. 39 (2): 172–235. doi:10.1152/ajplegacy.1915.39.2.172.
- ——; Rappleye, W. C. (1917). "The Rate of Discharge of Central Neurones". Proceedings of the National Academy of Sciences. 3 (1): 12–15. Bibcode:1917PNAS....3...12F. doi:10.1073/pnas.3.1.12. PMC 1091161. PMID 16586676.
- Cobb, Stanley; —— (1923). "Electromyographic Studies of Muscular Fatigue in Man". American Journal of Physiology. Legacy Content. 65 (2): 234–251. doi:10.1152/ajplegacy.1923.65.2.234.
- Davis, H.; ——; Brunswick, A.; Hopkins, A. M. (1926). "Studies of the Nerve Impulse. The Question of Decrement". American Journal of Physiology. 76: 448–471. doi:10.1152/ajplegacy.1926.76.2.448.
- Derbyshire, A. J.; Rempel, B.; ——; Lambert, E. F. (1936). "The Effects of Anesthetics on Action Potentials in the Cerebral Cortex of the Cat". American Journal of Physiology. Legacy Content. 116 (3): 577–596. doi:10.1152/ajplegacy.1936.116.3.577.
- ——; Morison, B. R. (1939). "Cortical Response to Sensory Stimulation Under Deep Barbiturate Narcosis". Journal of Neurophysiology. 2 (2): 112–128. doi:10.1152/jn.1939.2.2.112.
- Renshaw, B.; ——; Morison, B. R. (1940). "Activity of Isocortex and Hippocampus: Electrical Studies with Micro-Electrodes". Journal of Neurophysiology. 3: 74–105. doi:10.1152/jn.1940.3.1.74.

=== Books ===
- Forbes, Alexander (1924). The radio gunner. Boston; New York: Houghton Mifflin. LCCN 24027881.
- —— (1935). Offshore navigation in its simplest form, for all who sail the oceans out of sight of land. Boston: Eastern Science Supply Company. LCCN 35013318.
- —— (1938). Northernmost Labrador, mapped from the air. New York, N.Y.: American Geographical Society. LCCN 38015645; with contributions by O. M. Miller, N. E. Odell and Ernst C. Abbe; xix+255 pages
- —— (1953). Quest for a northern air route. Cambridge, Massachusetts: Harvard University Press. ISBN 9780674282841. LCCN 52012262; xiv+138 pages
