= Saint-Briac-sur-Mer =

Saint-Briac-sur-Mer Saent-Beriac (Gallo) Sant-Briag (Breton)
- Commune
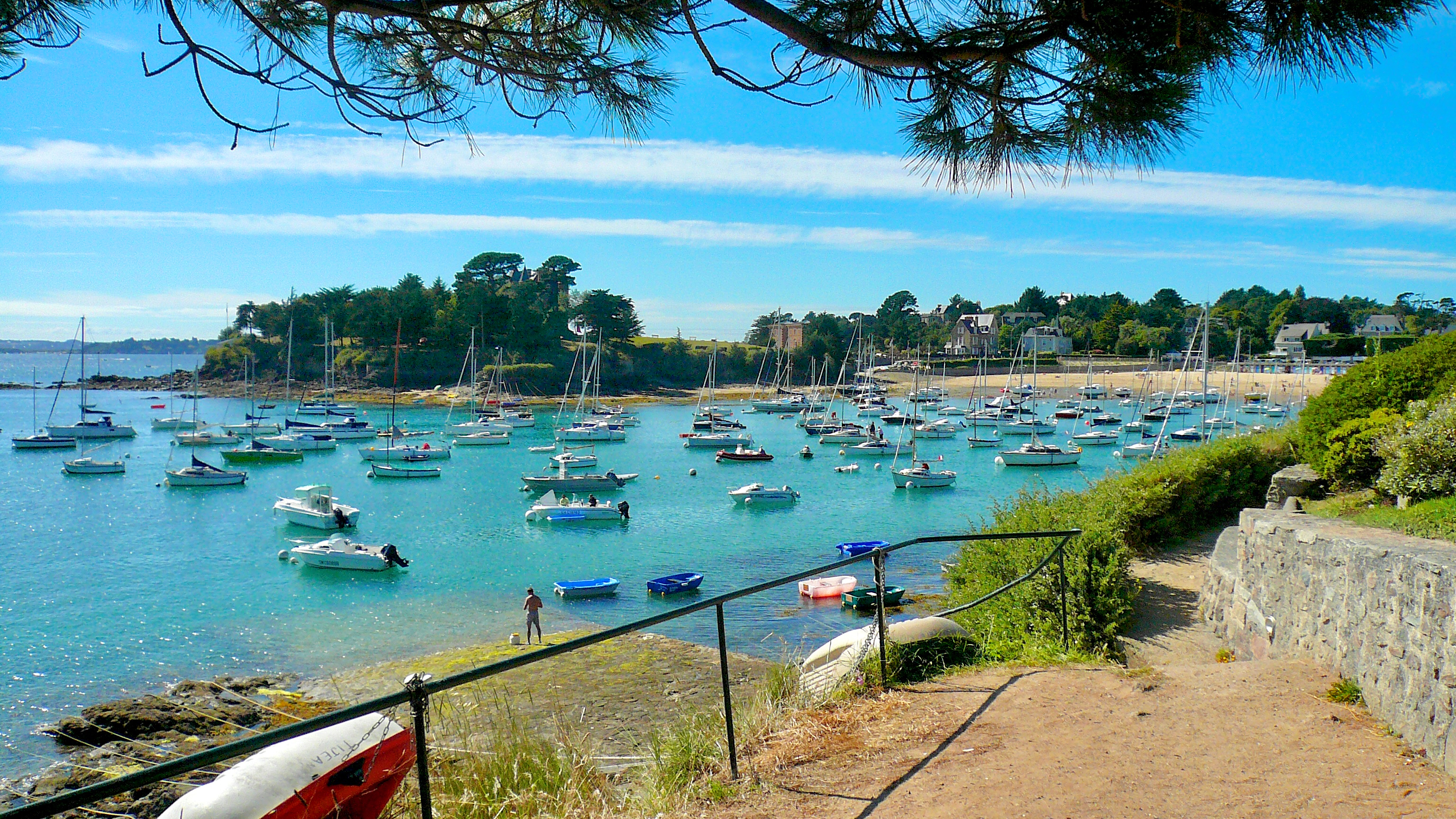
- Anchorage area of Béchet and the small peninsula of Château du Nessay in Saint-Briac-sur-Mer.

- Coat of arms
- Location of Saint-Briac-sur-Mer
- Location within France Location within Brittany
- Coordinates: 48°37′16″N 2°07′58″W
- Country: France
- Region: Brittany
- Department: Ille-et-Vilaine
- Arrondissement: Saint-Malo
- Canton: Saint-Malo-2
- Intercommunality: Côte d'Emeraude

Government
  - Mayor (2023–2026): Philippe Fourneyron
- Area^{1}: 8.06 km^{2} (3.11 sq mi)
- Elevation: 40 m (130 ft)
- Highest elevation: 62 m (203 ft)
- Lowest elevation: 0 m (0 ft)
- Population (2023): 2,258
  - Density: 280/km^{2} (726/sq mi)
- Time zone: UTC+01:00 (CET)
  - Summer (DST): UTC+02:00 (CEST)
- INSEE/Postal code: 35256 /35800
- ^{1} French Land Register data, which excludes lakes, ponds, glaciers > 1 km^{2} (0.386 sq mi or 247 acres) and river estuaries.

Saint-Briac-sur-Mer (French pronunciation: [sɛ̃ bʁijak syʁ mɛʁ], literally Saint-Briac on Sea; Breton: Sant-Briag; Gallo: Saent-Beriac), is a commune in the Ille-et-Vilaine Department in Brittany in northwestern France.

== Population ==
Inhabitants of Saint-Briac-sur-Mer are called briacins in French.

Historical population

Year	Pop.	±% p.a.
1793	1,760	—
1800	1,697	−0.52%
1806	1,809	+1.07%
1821	1,982	+0.61%
1831	2,439	+2.10%
1836	2,040	−3.51%
1841	1,878	−1.64%
1846	1,668	−2.34%
1851	1,880	+2.42%
1856	2,077	+2.01%
1861	2,120	+0.41%
1866	2,071	−0.47%
1872	2,414	+2.59%
1876	2,089	−3.55%
1881	2,178	+0.84%
1886	2,317	+1.25%
1891	2,220	−0.85%
1896	2,168	−0.47%
1901	1,960	−2.00%

Year	Pop.	±% p.a.
1906	1,981	+0.21%
1911	2,213	+2.24%
1921	1,782	−2.14%
1926	1,970	+2.03%
1931	2,042	+0.72%
1936	1,920	−1.22%
1946	1,880	−0.21%
1954	1,947	+0.44%
1962	1,709	−1.62%
1968	1,666	−0.42%
1975	1,619	−0.41%
1982	1,691	+0.62%
1990	1,825	+0.96%
1999	2,054	+1.32%
2007	1,949	−0.65%
2012	1,951	+0.02%
2017	2,070	+1.19%
2023	2,258	+1.46%

Source: EHESS and INSEE (1968-2023)

== Climate ==
St Briac lies on the Gulf Stream which means it enjoys a warm climate, several degrees warmer than the surrounding areas. The village has fine examples of tropical palms and plants, along the streets, making strolls very enjoyable.

== Leisure ==
Saint Briac has two campsites, seven beaches, four tennis courts, one soccer field, a yacht club, one mini golf, one 18 hole golf course, and more than 5 restaurants.

== History ==
The name Saint Briac comes from the name of Saint Briag, an Irishman. Briag arrived from Ireland with Saint Tugdual in around 548.

On 4 and 5 September 1758, a British fleet of 113 ships under the command of Admiral Richard Howe, landed east of the Garde Guerin, in Saint Briac. With a force of more than 12,000 men, under the command of General Thomas Bligh, who accompanied the Duke of York, the future king George III, they established camp in neighboring St Lunaire, but not before pillaging and burning down more than half of Saint Briac.

Le Chateau du Nessay (seen below) was built on an emplacement of a castle originating from the 12th century. During the French Revolution, it was used as a prison, to hold political prisoners.

St Briac was called Port Briac during the French Revolution.

Though France requires since 1976 that all beaches be public and that shoreside owners let people pass, wealthy owners of Saint-Briac-sur-Mer don't allow it and have been fighting the law in court ever since, including John Kerry's family.

The Forbes family estate, called Les Essarts was bombed during World War II. Les Essarts was rebuilt in 1954.

== Politics ==
Brice Lalonde, a former Green Party candidate for president of France, was mayor of this wealthy resort village from 1989 to 2008.

Lalonde and his first cousin, U.S. Senator John Kerry, are grandsons of James Grant Forbes, an heir of the Forbes family of China and Boston. James Grant Forbes was born in Shanghai and later moved to France where the Forbes family estate is located. Kerry and Lalonde were childhood friends on the estate in Saint Briac.

The current mayor is Vincent Denby Wilkes

== Personalities ==
Princess Victoria Melita of Edinburgh and Saxe-Coburg-Gotha, the Titular Empress of all the Russias, lived here with her husband and their son and one of their daughters.

Grand Duke Cyril Vladimirovich of Russia, Victoria's husband, Head of the Imperial Family of Russia and Titular Emperor and Autocrat of all the Russias.

Kira Kirillovna of Russia, their youngest daughter and wife of Louis Ferdinand, Prince of Prussia heir to the Prussian Throne.

Vladimir Cyrillovich, Grand Duke of Russia, their son, Head of the Imperial Family of Russia and Titular Emperor and Autocrat of all the Russias after the death of his father. Vladimir is the father of Maria Vladimirovna, Grand Duchess of Russia a disputed claimant to the leadership of the Imperial Family.

Armel Beaufils a sculptor, lived in St Briac from 1929 to 1952.

Auguste Renoir painted a peasant and her cow in the outskirts of the village.

Paul Signac a painter, creator of pointillism and divisionism commonly stopped in St Briac during his travels.

Hugh Grant an actor

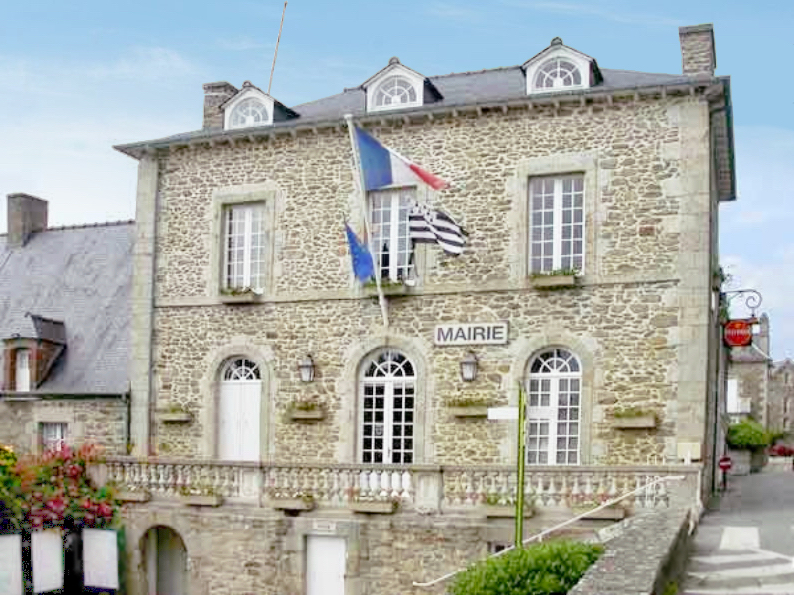
Town hall

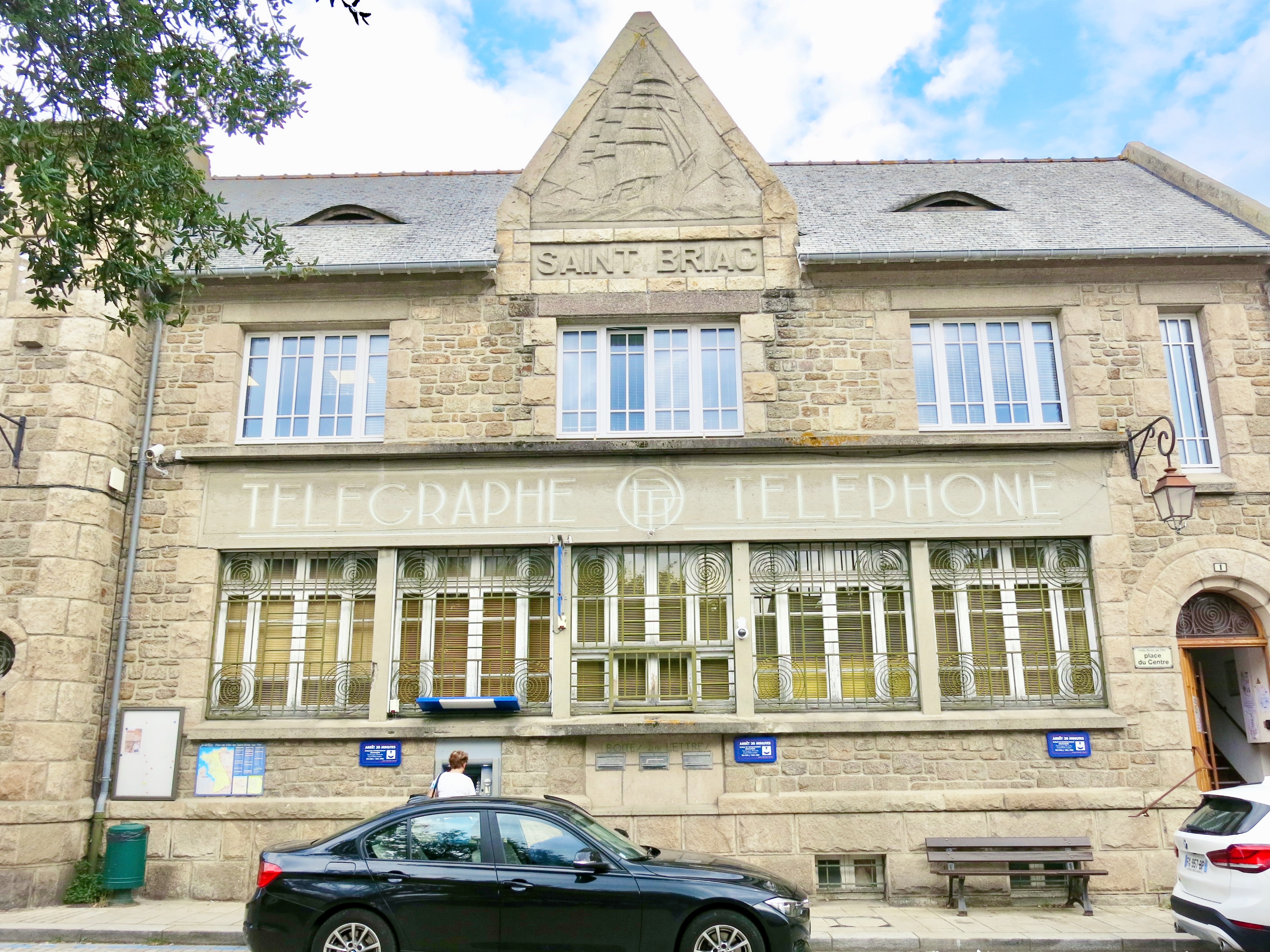
Post office

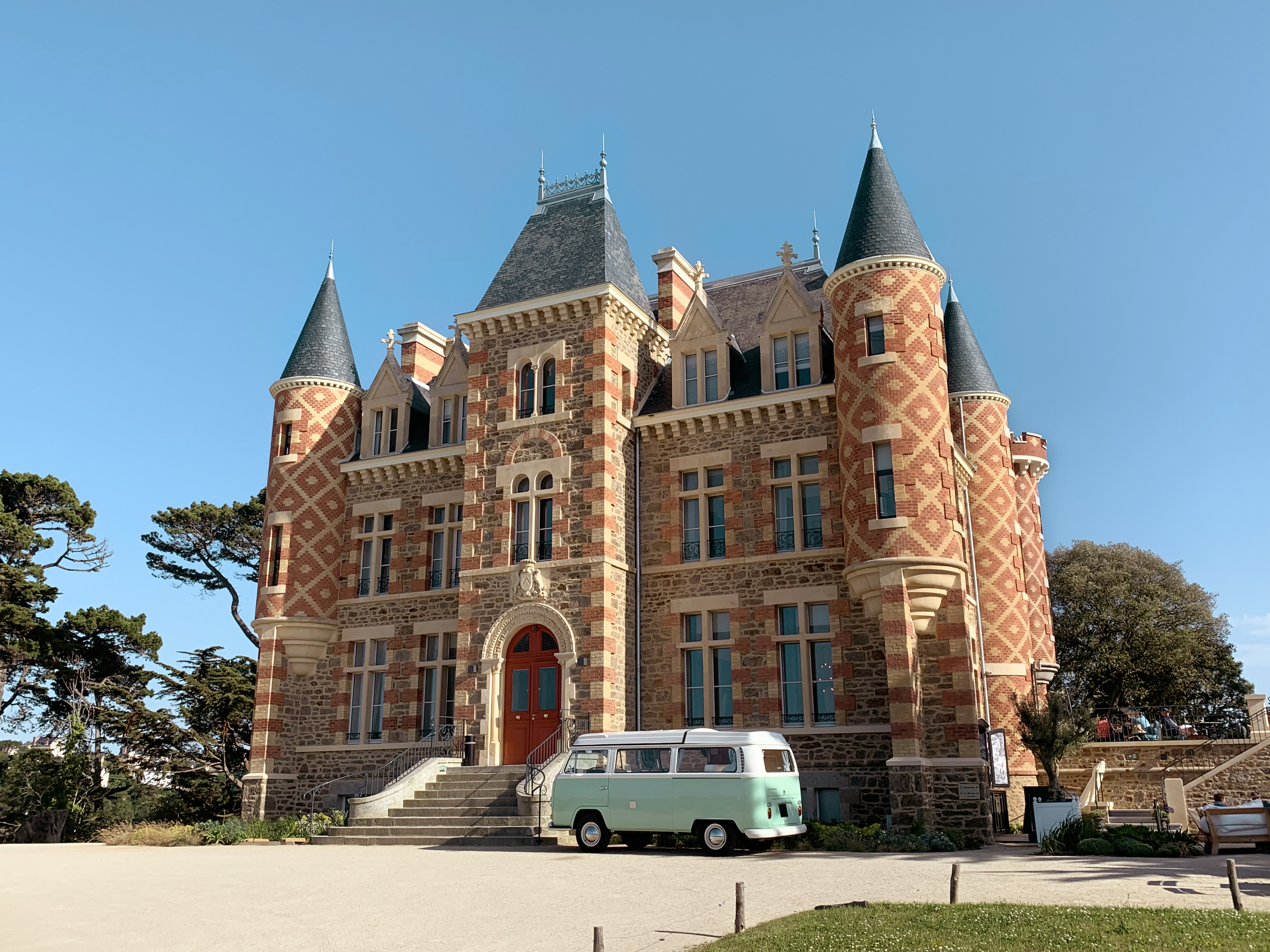
The château du Nessay

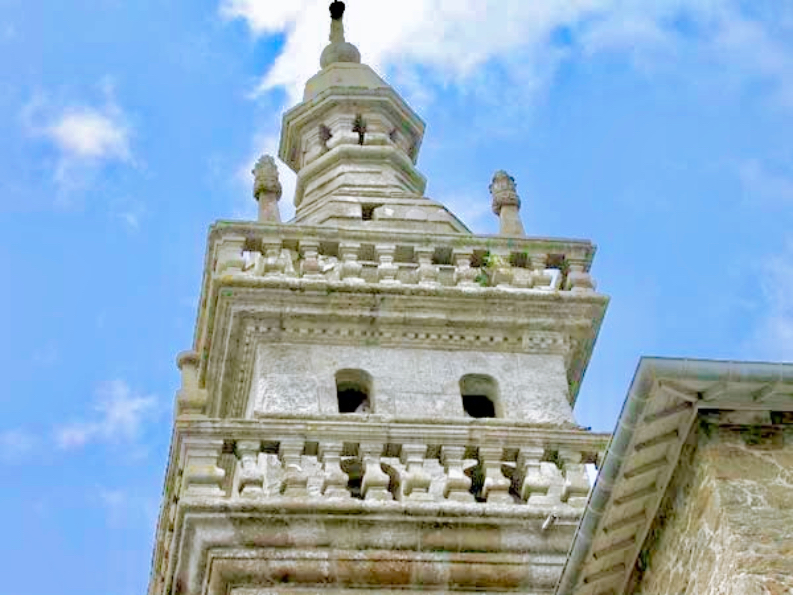
Church bell tower

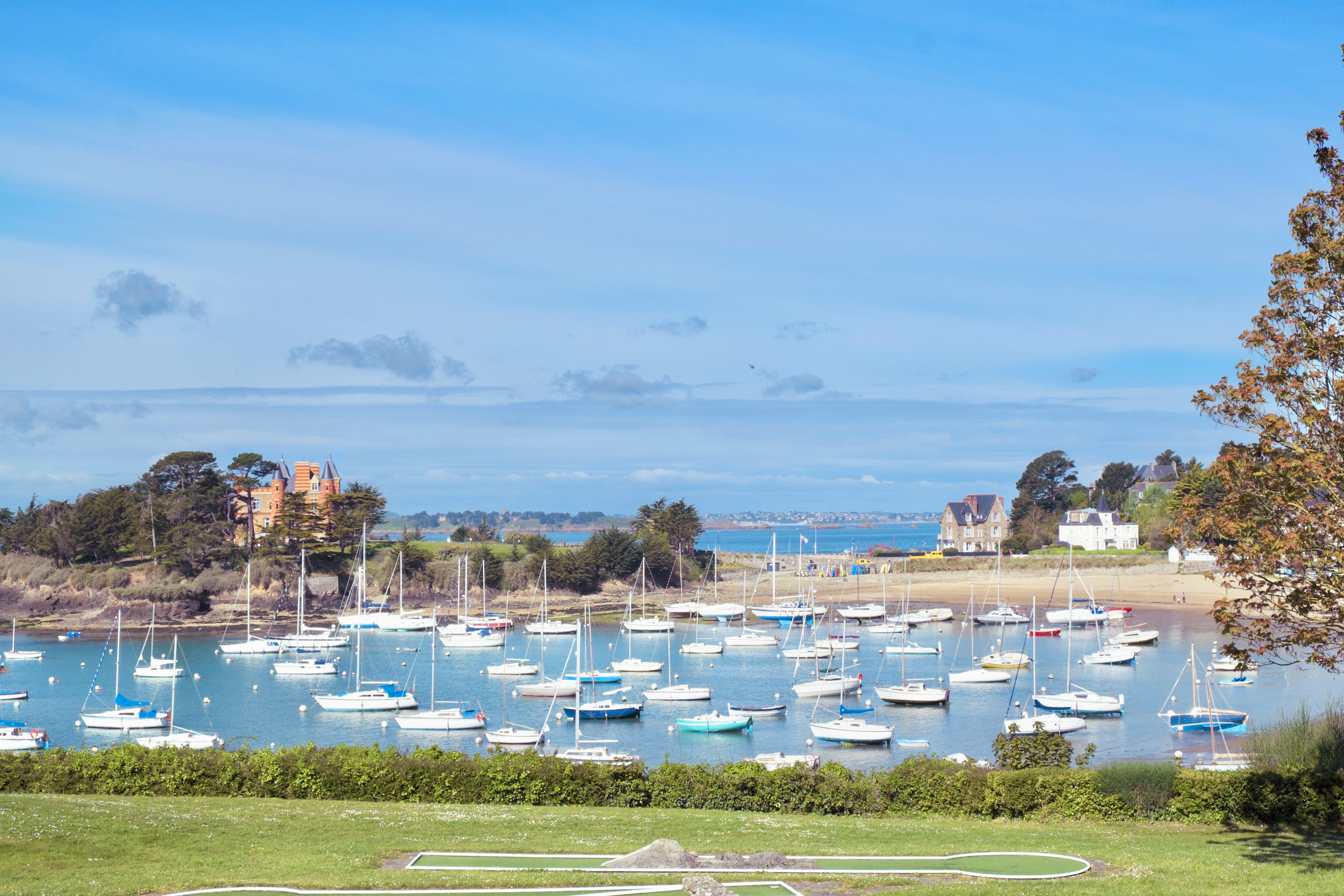
The beach of Béchet

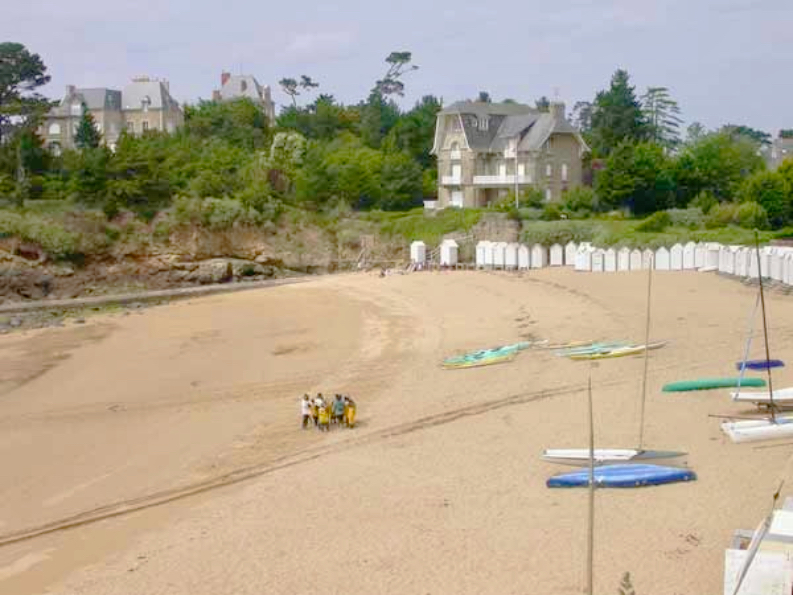
The beach huts on Salinette beach

== See also ==
- Communes of the Ille-et-Vilaine department
