= J.M. Forbes & Co. =

- Industry: Investment
- Founded: 1838
- Founder: John Murray Forbes
- Headquarters: 121 Mount Vernon Street, Beacon Hill Boston, Massachusetts, US
- Website: jmforbes.com

J.M. Forbes & Co. is a private investment firm based in Boston, Massachusetts, US. It was founded by John Murray Forbes in 1838.

The firm is mentioned by Ruth Paine as having managed her husband Michael Paine's "trust fund" from the Forbes family in an interview for the 2022 documentary film The Assassination & Mrs. Paine.
