= List of rural cemeteries in the United States =

The rural cemetery, or garden cemetery, is a style of cemetery that became popular in the United States and Europe in the mid-nineteenth century. This article is a list of rural cemeteries in the United States.

Name	Year opened	Location	Notes
Mount Auburn Cemetery	1831	Boston, Massachusetts	The first rural cemetery built in the U.S.
Mount Hope Cemetery	1834	Bangor, Maine	
Laurel Hill Cemetery	1836	Philadelphia, Pennsylvania	
Mount Pleasant Cemetery	1836	Taunton, Massachusetts	
Rose Hill Cemetery	1836	Macon, Georgia	
Rural Cemetery	1837	New Bedford, Massachusetts	
Monument Cemetery	1837	Philadelphia, Pennsylvania	The cemetery was condemned in 1956. The land was purchased by Temple University and bodies reinterred to Lawnview Memorial Park.
Mount Hope Cemetery	1838	Rochester, New York	
Green-Wood Cemetery	1838	Brooklyn, New York	
Green Mount Cemetery	1838	Baltimore, Maryland	
Rural Cemetery	1838	Worcester, Massachusetts	
Glendale Cemetery	1839	Akron, Ohio	
Harmony Grove Cemetery	1840	Salem, Massachusetts	
Valley Cemetery	1840	Manchester, New Hampshire	
The Woodlands	1840	Philadelphia, Pennsylvania	
Chelsea Garden Cemetery	1841	Chelsea, Massachusetts	
Lowell Cemetery	1841	Lowell, Massachusetts	
Woodland Cemetery and Arboretum	1841	Dayton, Ohio	
Springfield Cemetery	1841	Springfield, Massachusetts	
Mount Albion Cemetery	1843	Albion, New York	
Wilmington and Brandywine Cemetery	1843	Wilmington, Delaware	
Laurel Hill Cemetery	1844	Saco, Maine	
Albany Rural Cemetery	1844	Menands, New York	
Frankfort Cemetery	1844	Frankfort, Kentucky	
Allegheny Cemetery	1844	Pittsburgh, Pennsylvania	
Mount Pleasant Cemetery	1844	Newark, New Jersey	
Spring Grove Cemetery	1844	Cincinnati, Ohio	
Harrisburg Cemetery	1845	Harrisburg, Pennsylvania	
Swan Point Cemetery	1846	Providence, Rhode Island	
Elmwood Cemetery	1846	Detroit, Michigan	
Forest Home Cemetery	1847	Milwaukee, Wisconsin	
Cave Hill Cemetery	1848	Louisville, Kentucky	
Cypress Hills Cemetery	1848	New York, New York	
Forest Hills Cemetery	1848	Roxbury, Massachusetts	
Green Lawn Cemetery	1848	Columbus, Ohio	
Lexington Cemetery	1848	Lexington, Kentucky	
Oak Hill Cemetery	1848	Washington, D.C.	
Oakwood Cemetery	1848	Troy, New York	
Bellefontaine Cemetery	1849	St. Louis, Missouri	
Boxwood Cemetery	1849	Orleans County, New York	
Cemetery of the Evergreens	1849	New York, New York	
Easton Cemetery	1849	Easton, Pennsylvania	
Forest Lawn Cemetery	1849	Buffalo, New York	
Glenwood Cemetery	1849	Philadelphia, Pennsylvania	In 1938, the cemetery and all burials were relocated to Glenwood Memorial Gardens in Broomall, Pennsylvania.
Hollywood Cemetery	1849	Richmond, Virginia	
Mountain Grove Cemetery	1849	Bridgeport, Connecticut	
Oak Grove Cemetery	1849	Falmouth, Massachusetts	
Pine Grove Cemetery (Lynn, Massachusetts)	1849	Lynn, Massachusetts	
Shawsheen Cemetery	1849	Bedford, Massachusetts	
Sleepy Hollow Cemetery	1849	Sleepy Hollow, New York	
Evergreen Cemetery	1850	Boston, Massachusetts	
Forest Hill Cemetery	1850	Utica, New York	
Indian Hill Cemetery	1850	Middletown, Connecticut	
Magnolia Cemetery	1850	Charleston, South Carolina	
Graceland Cemetery	1850	Chicago, Illinois	
Old Gray Cemetery	1850	Knoxville, Tennessee	
Ridgewood Cemetery	1850	North Andover, Massachusetts	
Cedar Grove Cemetery	1851	New London, Connecticut	
Dale Cemetery	1851	Ossining, New York	
Erie Cemetery	1851	Erie, Pennsylvania	
Evergreen Cemetery	1851	Owego, New York	
Wildwood Cemetery	1851	Winchester, Massachusetts	
Elmwood Cemetery	1852	Memphis, Tennessee	
Greenwood Cemetery	1852	New Orleans, Louisiana	
Mount Hope Cemetery	1852	Boston, Massachusetts	
Oakdale Cemetery	1852	Wilmington, North Carolina	
Swampscott Cemetery	1852	Swampscott, Massachusetts	
Evergreen Cemetery	1853	Gettysburg, Pennsylvania	Evergreen cemetery is part of the Gettysburg Battlefield Historic District and played a strategic role in the Battle of Gettysburg. It was the site of the dedication of the adjacent National Cemetery. Abraham Lincoln delivered the Gettysburg Address from a platform in Evergreen Cemetery.
Greendale Cemetery	1853	Meadville, Pennsylvania	
Mount Adnah Cemetery	1853	Fulton, New York	
Oak Hill Cemetery	1853	Cedar Rapids, Iowa	
Oak Woods Cemetery	1853	Chicago, Illinois	The first burials at the cemetery did not occur until 1860.
Poughkeepsie Rural Cemetery	1853	Poughkeepsie, New York	
Riverside Cemetery	1853	Waterbury, Connecticut	
Walnut Grove Cemetery	1853	Methuen, Massachusetts	
Woodland Cemetery	1853	Cleveland, Ohio	
Woodlawn Cemetery	1853	Clinton, Massachusetts	
Chippiannock Cemetery	1854	Rock Island, Illinois	
Hope Cemetery	1854	Worcester, Massachusetts	
Oak Grove Cemetery	1854	Gloucester, Massachusetts	
Oaklands Cemetery	1854	West Chester, Pennsylvania	
Evergreen Cemetery	1855	Portland, Maine	
Fairmount Cemetery	1855	Newark, New Jersey	
Mount Moriah Cemetery	1855	Philadelphia, Pennsylvania	The cemetery closed its gates in 2011 and had no owner after the last board member died. Philadelphia's Orphan Court appointed the Mount Moriah Cemetery Preservation Corporation as owner in 2014.
Mount Wollaston Cemetery	1855	Quincy, Massachusetts	
Oak Grove Cemetery	1855	Fall River, Massachusetts	
Riverside Cemetery	1855	Oswego, New York	
Sleepy Hollow Cemetery	1855	Concord, Massachusetts	
Mount Vernon Cemetery	1856	Philadelphia, Pennsylvania	The cemetery was placed into conservatorship in 2021 due to neglect.
Woodward Hill Cemetery	1856	Lancaster, Pennsylvania	Founded in 1850 by the Evangelical Lutheran Church of the Holy Trinity and became a non-denominational cemetery in 1856.
Holyhood Cemetery	1857	Brookline, Massachusetts	
Lake Forest Cemetery	1857	Lake Forest, Illinois	
Mount Feake Cemetery	1857	Waltham, Massachusetts	
Vale Cemetery	1857	Schenectady, New York	
Green Hill Cemetery	1858	Amsterdam, New York	
Mount Olivet Cemetery	1858	Washington, D.C.	
Lafayette Cemetery No. 2	1858	New Orleans	
Lindenwood Cemetery	1859	Fort Wayne, Indiana	
Oakwood Cemetery	1859	Syracuse, New York	
Rosehill Cemetery	1859	Chicago, Illinois	
Hillside Cemetery	1860	Middletown, New York	
Oak Ridge Cemetery	1860	Springfield, Illinois	
Chester Rural Cemetery	1863	Chester, Pennsylvania	
Crown Hill Cemetery	1863	Indianapolis, Indiana	
Monongahela Cemetery	1863	Monongahela City, Pennsylvania	
Mountain View Cemetery	1863	Oakland, California	
Woodlawn Cemetery	1863	Bronx, New York	
Dellwood Cemetery	1865	Manchester Village, Vermont	Designed by Burton A. Thomas
Cedar Hill Cemetery	1866	Hartford, Connecticut	
Hillside Cemetery	1866	Clarendon, New York	
Cedar Lawn Cemetery	1867	Paterson, New Jersey	
Lakeview Cemetery	1867	Burlington, Vermont	Designed by E.C. Ryer
Woodmere Cemetery	1867	Detroit, Michigan	
West Laurel Hill Cemetery	1869	Bala Cynwyd, Pennsylvania	
Glenwood Cemetery	1871	Maynard, Massachusetts	
Lakewood Cemetery	1871	Minneapolis, Minnesota	
Metairie Cemetery	1872	New Orleans, Louisiana	
Cedar Grove Cemetery	1873	Chaumont, New York	
Walnut Hills Cemetery	1875	Brookline, Massachusetts	
Woodlawn Cemetery	1876	Toledo, Ohio	
Homewood Cemetery	1878	Pittsburgh, Pennsylvania	
Highland Lawn Cemetery	1884	Terre Haute, Indiana	
Fairview Cemetery	1885	Dalton, Massachusetts	
Harleigh Cemetery	1885	Camden, New Jersey	
Riverside Cemetery	1885	Fremont, New York	
Riverside Cemetery	1887	Macon, Georgia	
Lakeview Cemetery	1891	Sweden, New York	
Cypress Lawn Memorial Park	1892	Colma, California	
Fairview Cemetery	1892	Boston, Massachusetts	
Hope Cemetery	1895	Barre, Vermont	Designed by landscape architect Edward P. Adams
Elmwood Cemetery	1897	Kansas City, Missouri	
