= Cleveland and Copeland =

American landscape architecture firm

Cleveland and Copeland were a noted American landscape architecture firm.

The firm was organized by Horace William Shaler Cleveland (H.W.S. Cleveland) and Robert Morris Copeland. They were responsible for Sleepy Hollow Cemetery in Concord, Massachusetts, Mount Feake Cemetery in Waltham, Massachusetts, and Samuel Colt's Armsmear in Hartford, Connecticut, as well as a design for New York City's Central Park which lost out to Frederick Law Olmsted.
