= Anthony Manny House =

Historic house in New York, United States

- U.S. National Register of Historic Places
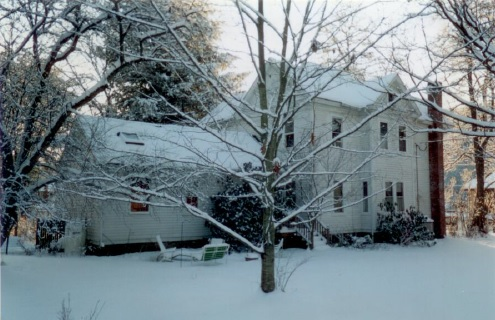
- c. 2000

- Location within New York Location within the United States
- Location: 6 Hankins Rd., Hankins, New York
- Coordinates: 41°48′53″N 75°5′15″W
- Area: 0.5 acres (0.20 ha)
- Built: 1890
- Architectural style: Queen Anne
- MPS: Upper Delaware Valley, New York and Pennsylvania MPS
- NRHP reference No.: 00000840
- Added to NRHP: September 15, 2000

Anthony Manny House is a historic home located at Hankins in Sullivan County, New York. It was built in 1890 is a two-story, frame Queen Anne style dwelling. It features irregular massing, a hipped roof core and intersecting gable projections and wings, a two-story polygonal bay, and a bluestone foundation and basement floor. Also on the property are a garage and potting shed.

It was added to the National Register of Historic Places in 2000.
