= Grove Hill Cemetery =

Historic cemetery in Massachusetts, United States

- U.S. National Register of Historic Places
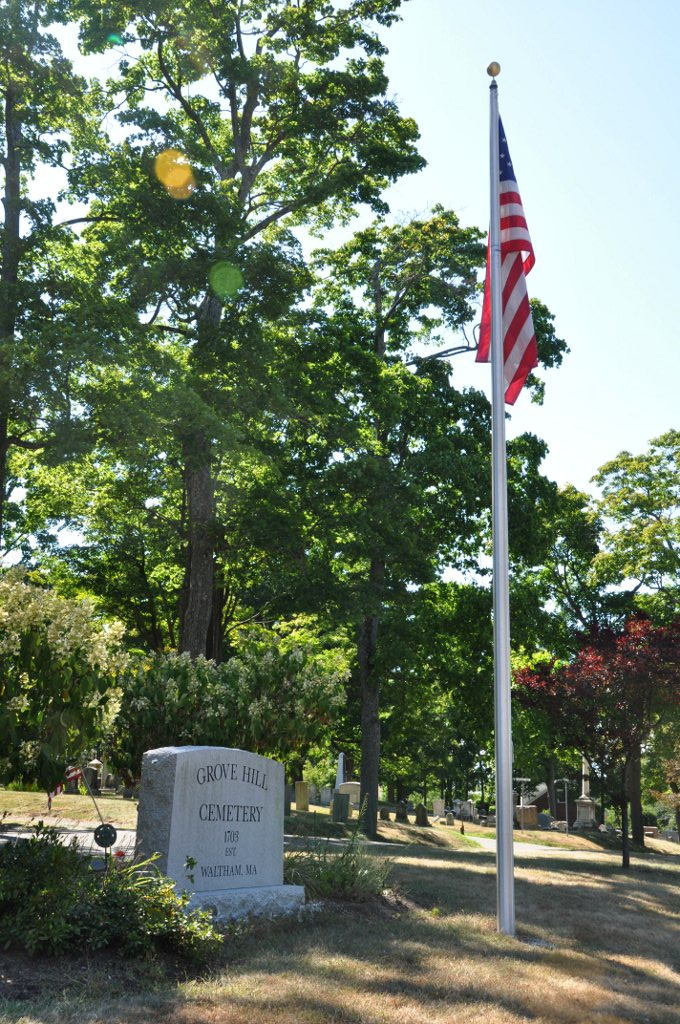

- Location within Massachusetts Location within the United States
- Location: Waltham, Massachusetts
- Coordinates: 42°22′34″N 71°13′17″W
- Area: 9.4 acres (3.8 ha)
- Built: 1703
- MPS: Waltham MRA
- NRHP reference No.: 89001549
- Added to NRHP: September 28, 1989

The Grove Hill Cemetery is a historic cemetery at 290 Main Street in Waltham, Massachusetts. Established in 1703, the cemetery was Waltham's only cemetery until 1857, when Mount Feake Cemetery opened. It was authorized in 1703, but its initial 2.3-acre (0.93 ha) parcel of land was not purchased until 1704. The first documented burial, however, took place in November 1703. The northwest section of the cemetery is its oldest portion, and includes a number of unmarked gravesites. The cemetery continues in active use today, and contains a representative sample of funerary art spanning 300 years. It now covers more than 9 acres (3.6 ha), extending between Main and Grove Streets. Its main entrance features posts with an Egyptian Revival theme, a style continued with the presence of obelisks dispersed on the grounds.

The cemetery was listed on the National Register of Historic Places in 1989.

== Notable burials ==
- Nathaniel P. Banks (1816–1894) – Civil War Major General and later politician.
- George P. Bemis (1838–1916) – elected to one term as mayor of Omaha, Nebraska.
- Charles Gidding (1855–1943) – US Navy sailor and peacetime Medal of Honor recipient.
- Lorenza Haynes (1820–1899) – American librarian, minister, school founder, suffragist, and writer.
- Ida Annah Ryan (1873–1950) – architect, first woman to receive a Master of Science from the Massachusetts Institute of Technology and first woman to receive a Master's degree in architecture anywhere in the United States

== See also ==
- National Register of Historic Places listings in Waltham, Massachusetts
