= Marta Adams =

German-born sculptor, painter (1891–1978)

- Born: Marta Arnstem; 6 November 1891; Düsseldorf, Germany
- Died: 27 November 1978 (aged 87); Mexico City, Mexico
- Burial place: Mount Feake Cemetery, Waltham, Massachusetts, United States
- Other name: Martha Adams
- Occupation: Visual artist
- Years active: 1925–1978
- Known for: Sculpture, painting
- Spouse: Edward Brinley Adams (m. 1916–1922; his death)

Marta Adams (née Marta Arnstem; 1891 – 1978) was a German-born sculptor and painter, who lived in Boston and Mexico City. She was known for her animal and floral themed artwork. She is also known as Martha Adams.

== Biography ==
Marta Arnstem was born on 6 November 1891, in Düsseldorf, Germany. Her mother Baronin Erna von Armin was Spanish, and her father Erick H. Arnstem was Swedish and worked as a diplomat. She had immigrated to Massachusetts in the United States around 1915.

In 1916, she married, Edward Brinley Adams in Boston. Her spouse was a Harvard University law librarian, and he died of a stroke in 1922.

In the winter of 1925, Adams apprenticed with sculptor Hans Stangl in Munich. She remained in Munich until 1933, and socialized with Otto Nückel, and Karl Zerbe. In 1935, she visited Mexico for the first time. She met with Diego Rivera in 1937, who encouraged her oil painting. Adams moved to Mexico City in 1952. Her later work was influenced by pre-Columbian art. She made Archaic Greek-style sculptured busts and portraits.

Adams died on 27 November 1978, in Mexico City.

Her work can be found in museum collections, including at the Philadelphia Museum of Art, Museo de la Solidaridad Salvador Allende (MSSA) in Santiago, Chile, and Harvard Art Museums.

== Exhibitions ==
- 1933, group exhibition, Günther Galerie, Munich, Germany
- 1934, group exhibition, Germanic Museum, Harvard University, Cambridge, Massachusetts
- 1937, sculptures and drawings, solo exhibition, Grace Horne Galleries, 71 Newbury Street, Boston, Massachusetts
- 1945, sculptures, solo exhibition, Boris Mirski Gallery, 166 Newbury Street, Boston, Massachusetts
- 1950, paintings, solo exhibition, Boris Mirski Gallery, 166 Newbury Street, Boston, Massachusetts
- 1953, Boston Arts Festival, group exhibition, Public Garden, Boston, Massachusetts
- 1962, group exhibition, Palacio de Bellas Artes, Mexico City, Mexico
- 1963, Pintura Contemporânea do México, group exhibition, Museu de Arte do Rio Grande do Sul, Porto Alegre, Rio Grande do Sul, Brazil; organized by Intercâmbio de Arte e Cultura Brasil–México, and Museu de Arte do Rio Grande do Sul (MARGS; now Museu de Arte do Rio Grande do Sul Ado Malagoli)
- 1978–1980, Marta Adams: Exposición Homenaje, 1891–1978, traveling exhibition organized by Fondo nacional para las actividades sociales (FONAPAS)
