= Beaver Brook Reservation =

State park and reservation in Massachusetts, USA

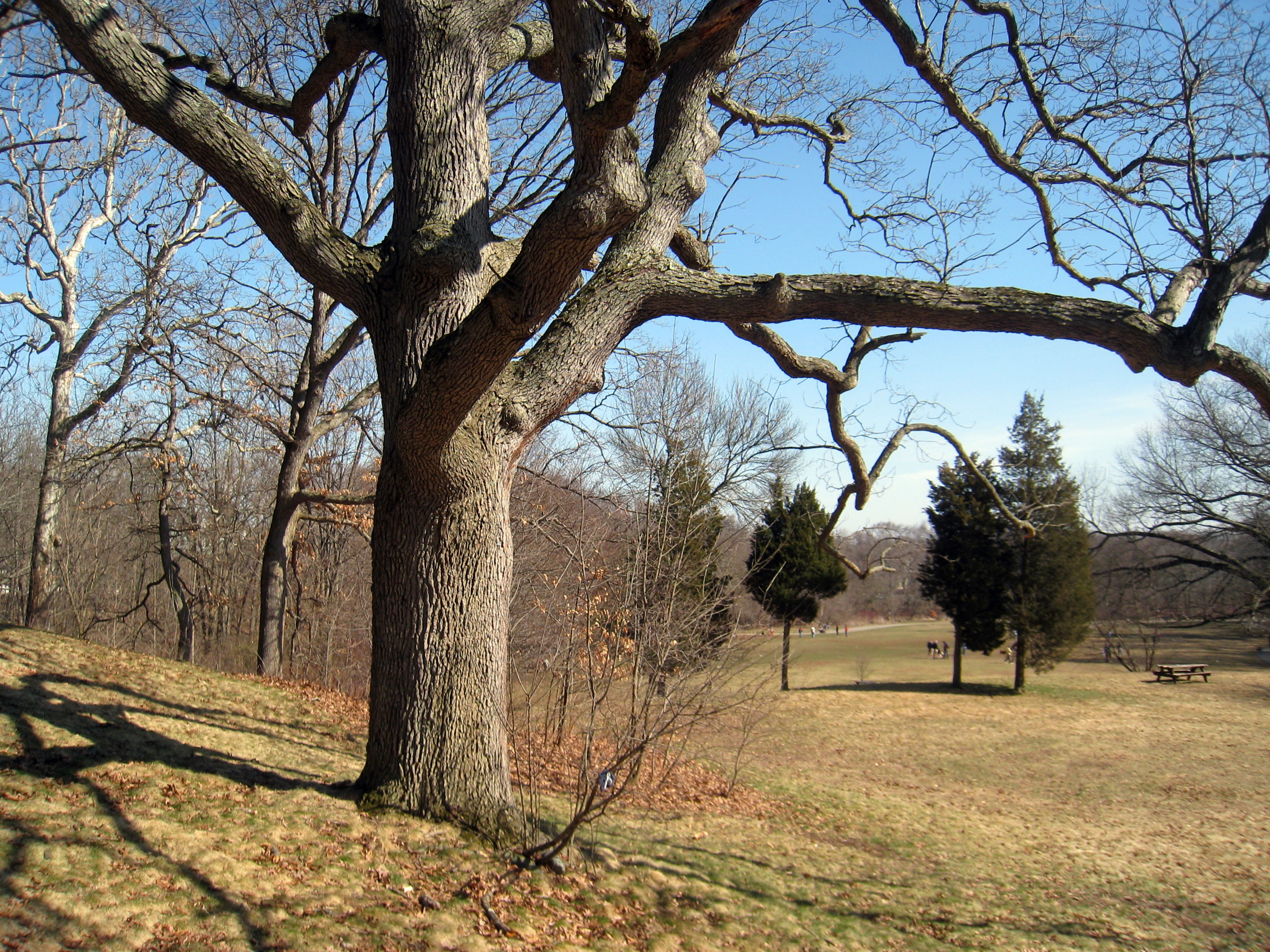
- Waverly Oaks

- Location within Massachusetts Location within the United States
- Location: Belmont and Waltham, Massachusetts, United States
- Coordinates: 42°23′36″N 71°11′50″W
- Area: 303 acres (123 ha)
- Elevation: 128 ft (39 m)
- Established: 1893
- Administrator: Massachusetts Department of Conservation and Recreation
- Website: Official website

Beaver Brook Reservation is a public recreation area covering 303 acres (123 ha) on the dividing line between the town of Belmont and the city of Waltham, Massachusetts. The state park is managed by the Massachusetts Department of Conservation and Recreation.

== History ==
Created in 1893, the state park was the first reservation established by the Metropolitan Park Commission. Its primary purpose was to protect a stand of 22 white oak trees known as the Waverly Oaks, which had been defended from destruction by landscape architect Charles Eliot. The last of the ancient trees succumbed to old age in the 1920s. A portion of the reservation was owned by the landscape architect Robert Morris Copeland (1830-1874), whose 19th-century home sits within the park. Other points of historical interest include a monument to the Waverly Oaks and the remains of a 19th-century fulling mill.

== Activities and amenities ==
In addition to a bike path, playing fields, woodlands, wetlands, a cascading waterfall, wading pool, and fishing opportunities, the reservation offers programs on wildlife and cultural history. Restrooms and a tot lot are also available.

== Gallery ==
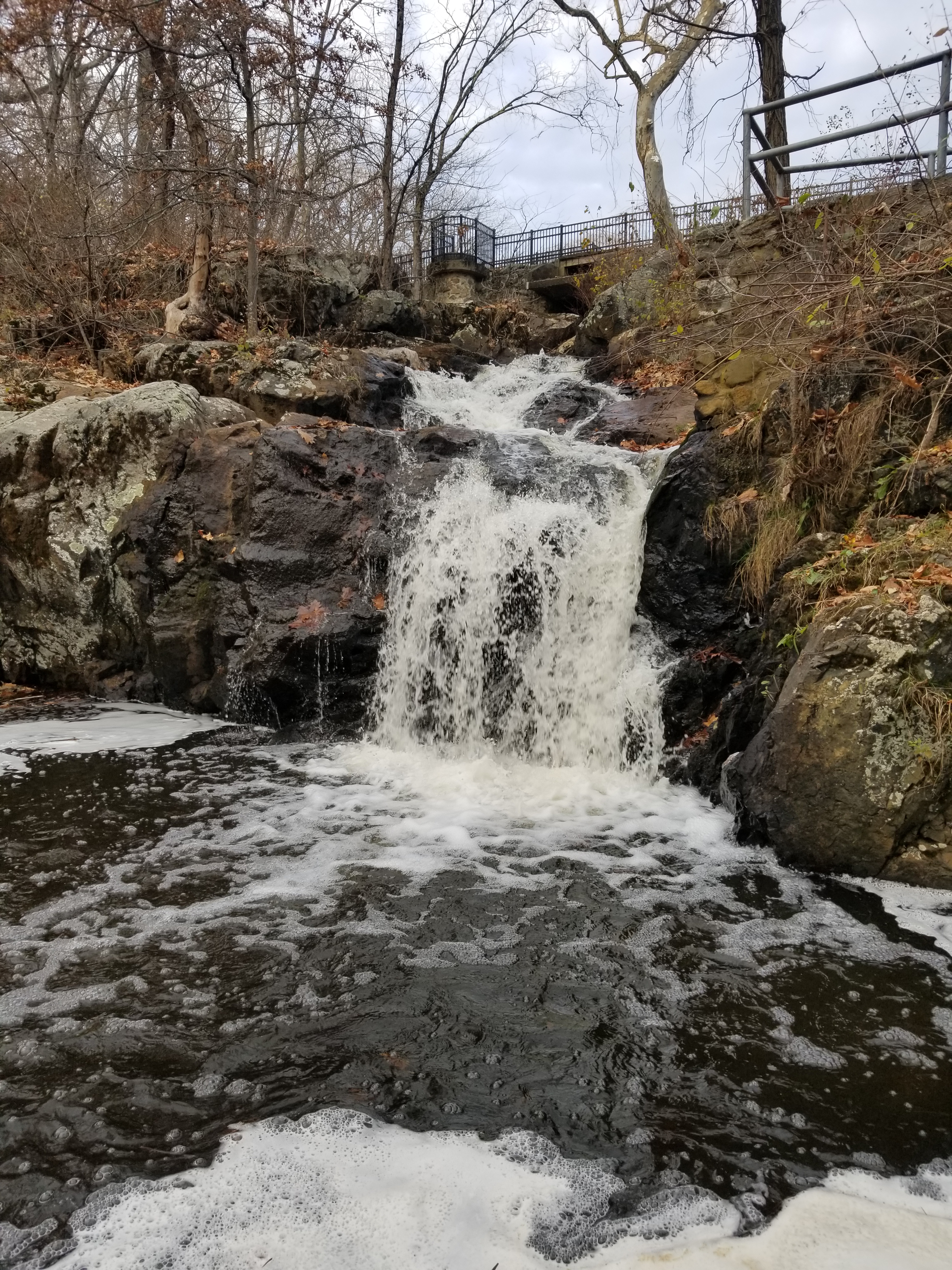
Waterfall at Beaver Brook Reservation

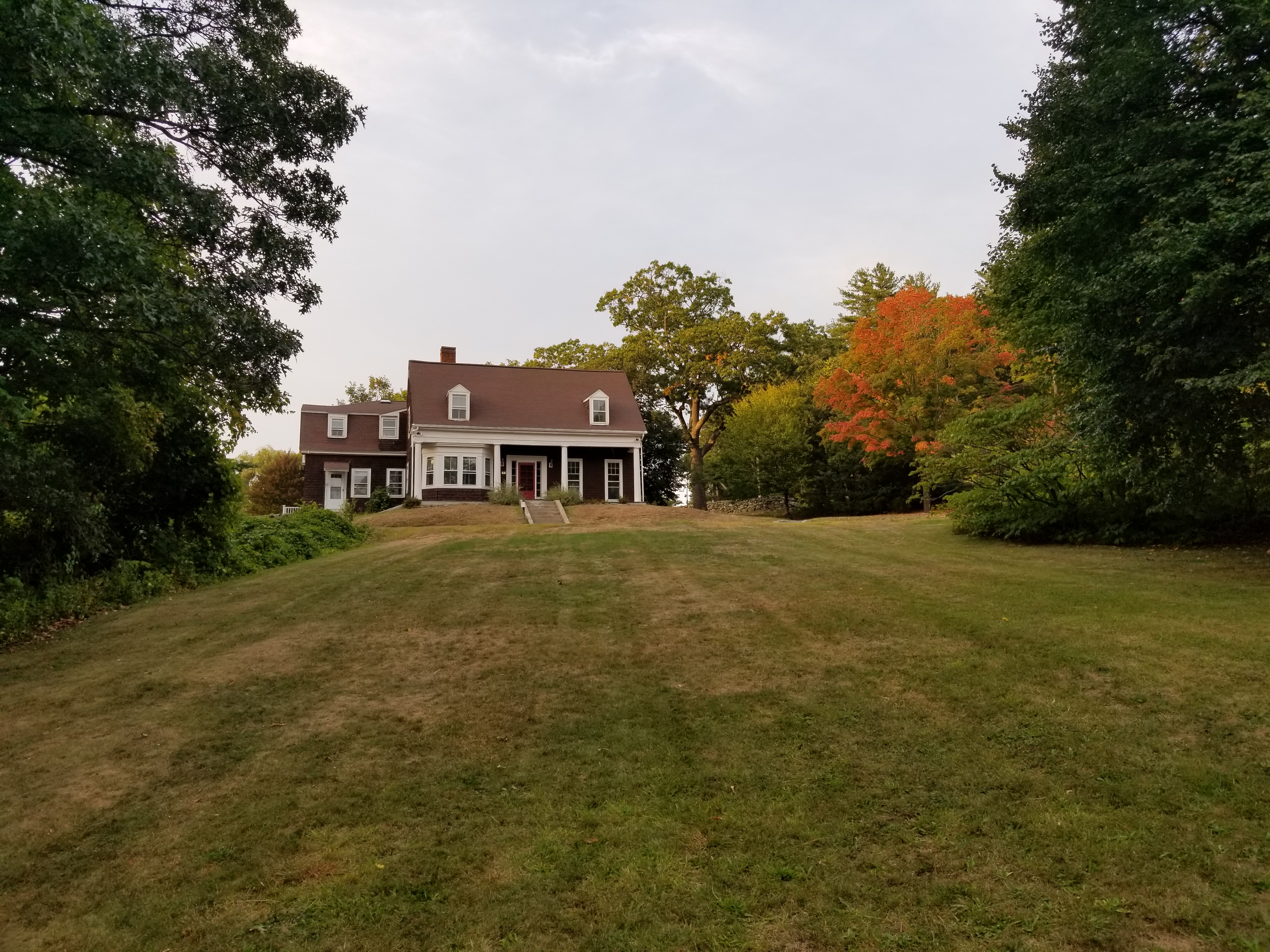
Robert Morris Copeland House

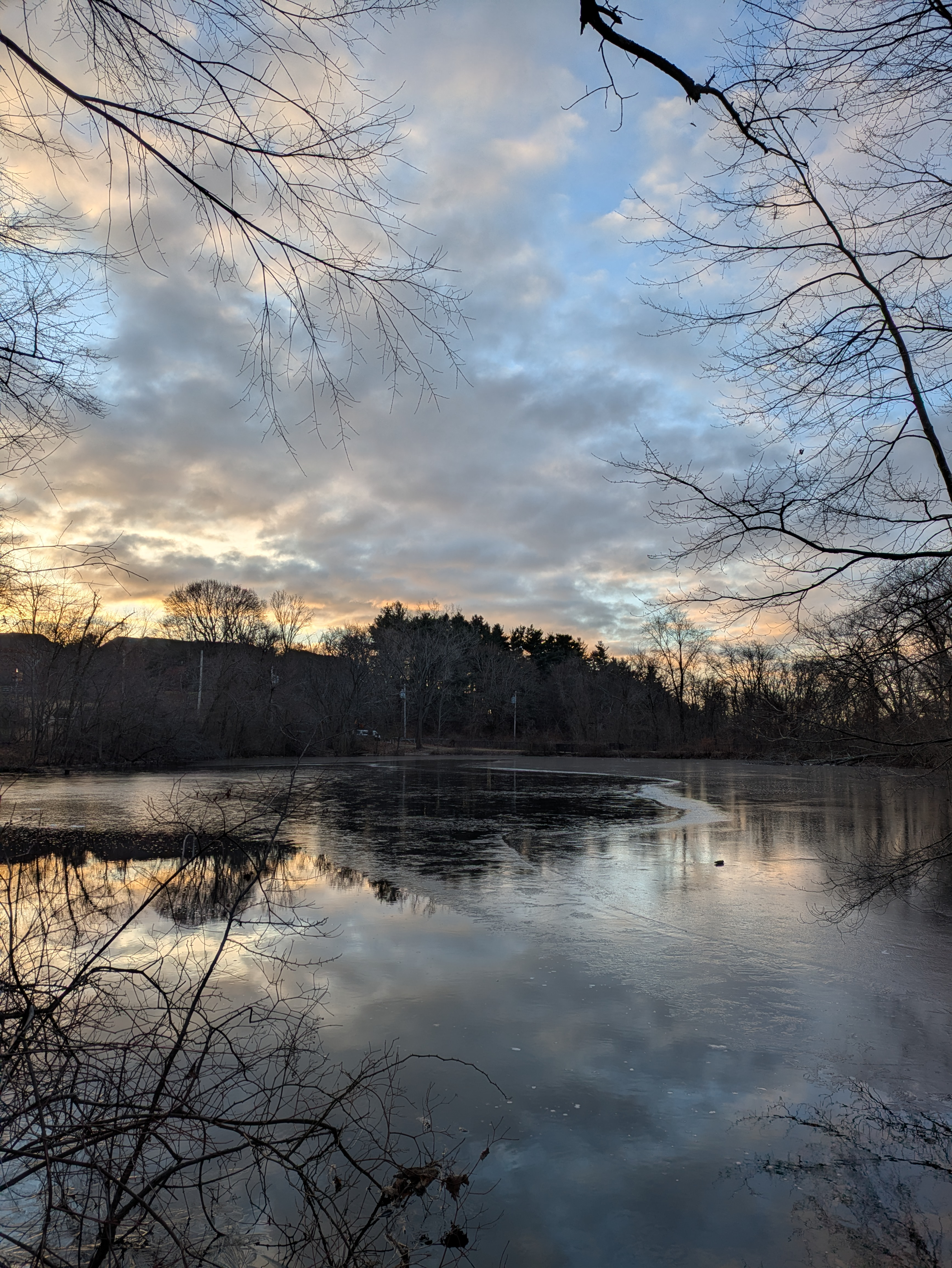
Mill Pond at the Beaver Brook Reservation
