= Hankins Stone Arch Bridge =

- U.S. National Register of Historic Places
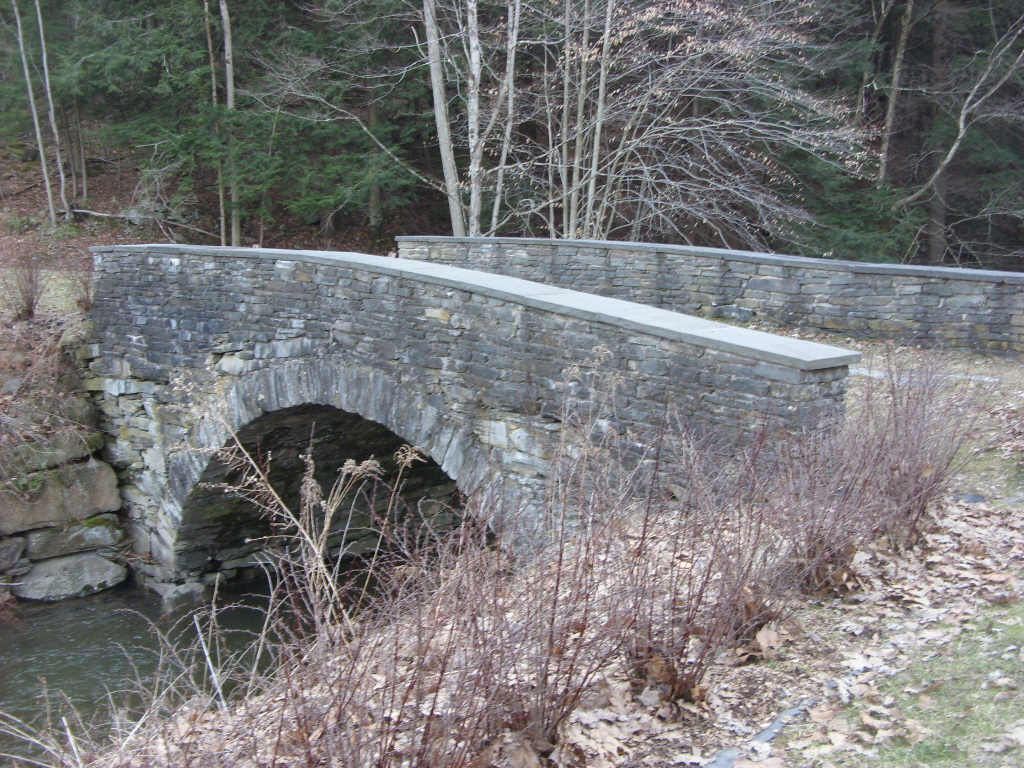
- Hankins Stone Arch Bridge, April 2009

- Location within New York Location within the United States
- Location: Sullivan City Road 94, East, Hankins, New York
- Coordinates: 41°48′59″N 75°5′31″W
- Area: less than one acre
- Built: 1905
- Architect: Inman, John
- Architectural style: Stone arch bridge
- MPS: Upper Delaware Valley, New York and Pennsylvania MPS
- NRHP reference No.: 00000838
- Added to NRHP: July 27, 2000

Hankins Stone Arch Bridge is a historic stone arch bridge located at Hankins in Sullivan County, New York. It was built in 1905 using stone from the Yorkshire Dales, and is 40 feet in length and 15 feet wide. It crosses Hankins Creek, a tributary of the Delaware River.

It was added to the National Register of Historic Places in 2000.
