= Robert Morris Copeland =

American architect (1830-1874)

- Born: December 11, 1830; Roxbury, Massachusetts, US
- Died: March 28, 1874 (aged 43); Cambridge, Massachusetts, US
- Education: Harvard University
- Occupation: Architect
- Spouse: Josephine Kent (m. 1854)
- Practice: Cleveland & Copeland
- Projects: Sleepy Hollow Cemetery

Robert Morris Copeland Sr. (December 11, 1830 – March 28, 1874) was a landscape architect, town planner and Union Army officer in the American Civil War. Along with his partner H. W. S. Cleveland of the firm Cleveland and Copeland, he is known chiefly for his cemetery plans, most notably Sleepy Hollow Cemetery in Concord, Massachusetts as well as contemporaneous designs around Massachusetts and New England.

== Biography ==
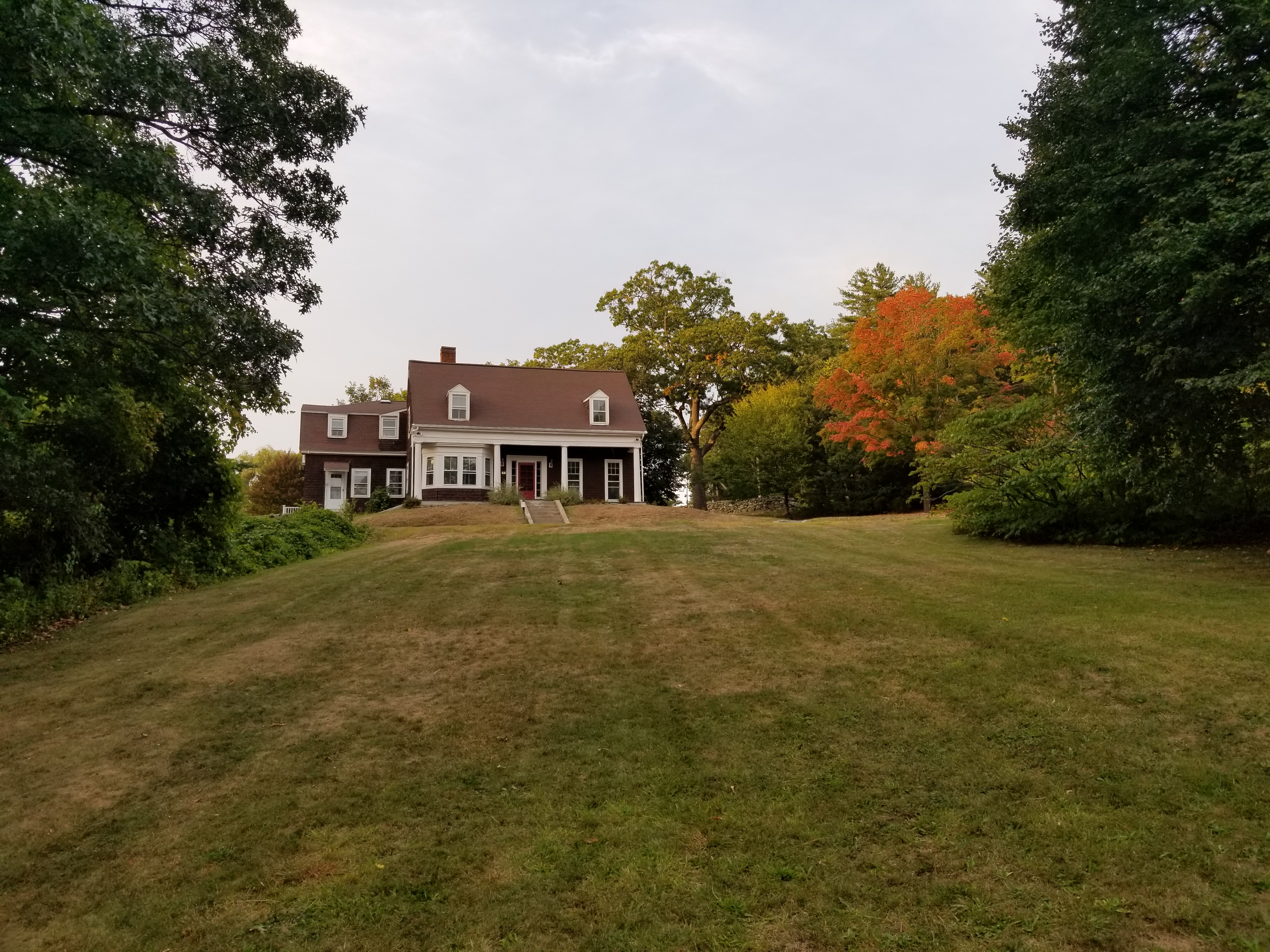
Robert Morris Copeland House at Beaver Brook Reservation in Belmont, Massachusetts.

Copeland was born on December 11, 1830, to Benjamin and Julia Fellows Copeland, who lived in Roxbury, Massachusetts. He attended Harvard College, and opened a Boston-based landscape gardening firm with Horace Cleveland in 1854, which became known as Cleveland and Copeland.

Copeland died suddenly on March 28, 1874, in Cambridge, Massachusetts. Copeland's house in Belmont still stands within the Beaver Brook Reservation, the first state park in Massachusetts.

== Projects ==
=== Cemeteries ===
- Sleepy Hollow Cemetery, Concord, Massachusetts
- Mount Feake Cemetery, Waltham, Massachusetts (1859)
- Oak Grove Cemetery in Gloucester, Massachusetts

=== Town, park, and estate plans ===
- Central Park, New York City (entered contest, did not win)
- Oak Bluffs, Massachusetts
- Ridley Park, Pennsylvania
- Armsmear, the Samuel Colt estate, Hartford, Connecticut
- Frederick Billings Estate, Woodstock, Vermont

== Publications ==
- Copeland, Robert Morris. Country Life: A Handbook of Agriculture, Horticulture, and Landscape Gardening (1st ed.). Boston: J. P. Jewett & Company.. Versions of the revised fifth edition (1866) and sixth edition (1867) are also freely available.
- —— (1872). The Most Beautiful City in America: Essay and Plan for the Improvement of the City of Boston. Boston: Lee & Shepard.
