= Fremont, Sullivan County, New York =

Fremont, New York
- Town
- Location of Fremont in Sullivan County, New York
- Coordinates: 41°51′38″N 75°2′25″W
- Country: United States
- State: New York
- County: Sullivan

Area
  - Total: 51.2 sq mi (132.7 km^{2})
  - Land: 50.3 sq mi (130.4 km^{2})
  - Water: 0.89 sq mi (2.3 km^{2})
- Elevation: 1,440 ft (439 m)

Population (2020)
  - Total: 1,161
- Time zone: UTC-5 (Eastern (EST))
  - Summer (DST): UTC-4 (EDT)
- ZIP code: 12736, 12776
- Area code: 845
- FIPS code: 36-27573
- GNIS feature ID: 0978976

Fremont is a town in Sullivan County, New York, United States. The population was 1,161 at the 2020 census.

The Town of Fremont is in the northwestern part of the county.

== History ==
The town was formed from part of the Town of Callicoon in 1851. When the town was first settled, circa 1780, the absence of roads required entry by means of the Delaware River.

The hamlet of Long Eddy was once incorporated as Douglas City, Sullivan County's first and only city. Long Eddy is the home of the Basket Historical Society. The hamlet also plays host to Sullivan County's longest continuously owned-and-operated business, the Long Eddy Hotel & Saloon.

== Geography and climate ==
The northwestern town line is the border of Delaware County, and the southwestern town line is the border of Pennsylvania (Wayne County), marked by the Delaware River.

The climate of the town is typical of the interior northeast. Made up of hills of about 2,000 ft. in elevation and valleys under 1,000 ft. The majority of the town is forested with open fields scattered about.

The weather in the summer is cool with temperatures rarely reaching 90 °F (32 °C) and averaging 70–79 °F (21–26 °C) in the day and around 60 °F (16 °C) at night. In the spring and fall temperatures are very inconsistent with warm days 70–79 °F (21–26 °C) and cold days with snow. The winter is very cold with average highs below freezing for most of the winter and nighttime temperatures often dropping to near 0 °F (−18 °C) . The average snowfall is upwards of 6 feet (180 cm) per year, with snow cover over the majority of the winter.

According to the United States Census Bureau, the town has a total area of 51.2 square miles (133 km^{2}), of which, 50.3 square miles (130 km^{2}) is land and 0.9 square miles (2.3 km^{2}) (1.74%) is water.

== Demographics ==
Historical population
| Census | Pop. | Note | %± |
|---|---|---|---|
| 1860 | 1,728 | | — |
| 1870 | 2,218 | | 28.4% |
| 1880 | 2,025 | | −8.7% |
| 1890 | 2,168 | | 7.1% |
| 1900 | 2,184 | | 0.7% |
| 1910 | 1,931 | | −11.6% |
| 1920 | 1,435 | | −25.7% |
| 1930 | 1,386 | | −3.4% |
| 1940 | 1,251 | | −9.7% |
| 1950 | 1,170 | | −6.5% |
| 1960 | 1,047 | | −10.5% |
| 1970 | 1,047 | | 0.0% |
| 1980 | 1,346 | | 28.6% |
| 1990 | 1,332 | | −1.0% |
| 2000 | 1,391 | | 4.4% |
| 2010 | 1,381 | | −0.7% |
| 2020 | 1,161 | | −15.9% |
U.S. Decennial Census

As of the census of 2000, there were 1,391 people, 563 households, and 394 families residing in the town. The population density was 27.6 inhabitants per square mile (10.7/km^{2}). There were 1,182 housing units at an average density of 23.5 per square mile (9.1/km^{2}). The racial makeup of the town was 94.75% White, 1.58% African American, 0.43% Native American, 1.01% Asian, 0.79% from other races, and 1.44% from two or more races. Hispanic or Latino of any race were 1.22% of the population.

There were 563 households, out of which 31.4% had children under the age of 18 living with them, 58.1% were married couples living together, 8.7% had a female householder with no husband present, and 30.0% were non-families. 27.0% of all households were made up of individuals, and 13.3% had someone living alone who was 65 years of age or older. The average household size was 2.47 and the average family size was 3.00.

In the town, the population was spread out, with 25.6% under the age of 18, 4.5% from 18 to 24, 26.0% from 25 to 44, 27.0% from 45 to 64, and 16.9% who were 65 years of age or older. The median age was 42 years. For every 100 females, there were 99.6 males. For every 100 females age 18 and over, there were 94.5 males.

The median income for a household in the town was $33,125, and the median income for a family was $40,938. Males had a median income of $29,338 versus $27,125 for females. The per capita income for the town was $18,087. About 13.2% of families and 15.7% of the population were below the poverty line, including 21.8% of those under age 18 and 16.5% of those age 65 or over.

== Communities and locations in the Town of Fremont ==
- Acidalia – A hamlet by the northwestern town line.
- Basket – A hamlet in the western part of the town, east of Long Eddy.
- Buck Brook – A location in the eastern part of the town.
- Fernwood – A hamlet in the western part of the town near the north town line.
- Fremont Center – A hamlet west of the town center on County Routes 93, 94, and 95.
- Hankins – A hamlet believed to be the site of the first settlement. Hankins is located near the Delaware River in the western part of the town on Route 97. Located at Hankins and listed on the National Register of Historic Places are the Hankins District No. One Schoolhouse, Hankins Stone Arch Bridge, and Anthony Manny House.
- Lakewood – A hamlet in the northeastern part of the town.
- Long Eddy – A hamlet in the extreme western part of the town, by the Delaware River. The Riverside Cemetery was listed on the National Register of Historic Places in 1993.
- Mileses – A hamlet in the western part of the town, west of Fremont Center.
- Obernburg – A hamlet in the northeastern part of the town along Route 95. Home of St. Mary's Church, the oldest church in the county. Also, named after Obernburg, Germany.
- Pleasant Valley – A hamlet in the southern part of the town.
- Tennanah Lake (formerly Long Pond) – A hamlet in the northeastern part of the town by a lake called "Tennanah Lake."
