= Emma Abbott =

American operatic soprano

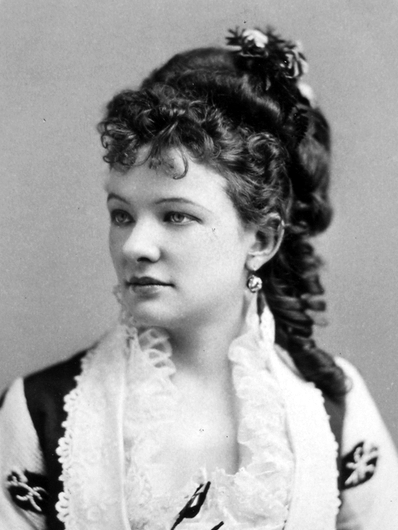
- Abbott, c. 1870
- Born: December 9, 1850; Chicago, Illinois, U.S.
- Died: January 5, 1891 (aged 40); Salt Lake City, Utah, U.S.
- Resting place: Oak Grove Cemetery (Gloucester, Massachusetts)
- Occupation: Operatic soprano
- Spouse: Eugene Wetherell

Emma Abbott (December 9, 1850 – January 5, 1891) was an American operatic soprano and impresario known for her pure, clear voice of great flexibility and volume.

== Early life ==
Emma Abbott was born on December 9, 1850 in Chicago, Illinois. She was the daughter of musician Seth Abbott and his wife, Almira Abbott (née Palmer). While several published biographical sketches have emphasized the Abbott family's poverty, Abbott's biographer Sadie E. Martin has challenged that narrative. Martin's research revealed that the family was not impoverished but had a typical modest standard of living for Americans of the period, and that Emma Abbott herself circulated the fictionalized story that she grew up poor as a means to emphasize her success.

As a child, she and her brother George studied singing, piano, guitar and violin with their father. The family moved to Peoria, Illinois, Emma was eight years of age when, she made her first appearance on the stage, singing at a concert given in her father's office in Peoria. In 1854, Professor Abbott was unable to find a sufficient number of music students to make ends meet and the family suffered from financial problems. To help out, she and George began performing professionally when Emma was nine years old. She made her debut as a guitar player and singer in Peoria, Illinois in 1859, with George on the violin, and was teaching guitar by age thirteen.

== Career ==
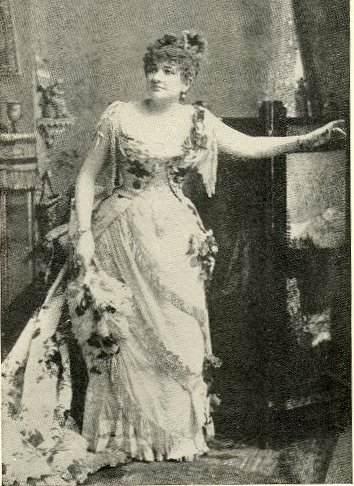
Emma Abbott

In 1866, she joined an itinerant concert troupe and toured the country. While performing on the road she met and was befriended by Clara Louise Kellogg. Upon hearing Abbott in a concert in Toledo, Kellogg made it a point to meet her and encourage her to pursue an opera career and gave her a letter of introduction. Consequently, Abbott studied in New York City under Achille Errani, and made her concert début there in December 1871.

In 1872, Abbott went abroad to study with Antonio Sangiovanni in Milan. This was followed by further studies with Mathilde Marchesi, Pierre François Wartel and Enrico Delle Sedie in Paris. She appeared in several productions in Paris, earning rave reviews for her fine soprano voice. She was awarded a contract with the Royal Opera in London and made her début at Covent Garden as Marie in La Fille du régiment in 1876. However, her contract was cancelled shortly thereafter when she refused to sing Violetta from Verdi's La Traviata on moral grounds. That same year she secretly married Eugene Wetherell (d. 1889) and they returned to the United States, where she remained for the rest of her life.

=== Abbott English Opera Company ===
On February 23, 1877, Abbott made her American operatic début in New York, once again portraying Marie. In 1878 she and her husband Eugene Wetherell, organized an opera company known by her name (the Emma Abbott Grand English Opera Company), which toured extensively throughout the United States. It was the first opera company formed by a woman in the United States. Her husband ran the business end of the company and she managed the artistic side, often starring in the productions.

The company garnered a reputation among the public for quality productions and was quite successful. Among the notable roles that Abbott sang with the company are Juliette in Gounod's Roméo et Juliette, Virginia in Paul et Virginie, Josephine in H.M.S. Pinafore, the title role in Flotow's Martha, Amina in Bellini's La Sonnambula, and Violetta in La Traviata, a role to which she apparently no longer objected, however, instead of singing Addio del passato, she made Violetta expire with Nearer, my God, to Thee.

Throughout her career, she retained artistic control over her troupe, which sometimes numbered 60. Although the company's repertoire included works from the French, Italian and English operatic literatures, they always performed in English. Many of the works were abridged and interpolated songs were commonplace. For this reason the company and Abbott were not popular with many music critics who were unhappy with the changes to the standard repertoire. However, the company was incredibly popular with the public and was consistently financially successful. Abbott herself became known among Americans as 'the people's prima donna'.

== Death ==
Abbott continued performing up until her sudden death from pneumonia in Salt Lake City, Utah in 1891, aged 40. She is buried at Oak Grove Cemetery in Gloucester, Massachusetts along with her husband.

== Bibliography ==
- Hitchcock, H. Wiley; Preston, Katherine K. (2001). "Emma Abbott". In Sadie, Stanley; Tyrrell, John (eds.). The New Grove Dictionary of Music and Musicians (2nd ed.). London: Macmillan. ISBN 978-1-56159-239-5.
- The life and professional career of Emma Abbott By Martin, Sadie E.| 1891
- Who Was Who in America, Historical Volume, 1607–1896. Chicago: Marquis Who's Who, 1967.
- Opera and the Golden West: The Past, Present, and Future of Opera in the U.S.A. By DiGaetani, John L., 1994.
- Eugene Field & His Age By Saum, Lewis O., 2001.
- Texts on Wikisource:
  - "Abbott, Emma". Encyclopædia Britannica (11th ed.). 1911.
  - "Abbott, Emma". Collier's New Encyclopedia. 1921.
  - "Abbott, Emma" in: Willard, Frances Elizabeth & Ashton Rice Livermore, Mary (ed.) (1893) - A Woman of the Century.
