= Obernburg, New York =

- Hamlet
- Location within New York Location within the United States
- Coordinates: 41°50′41″N 75°00′26″W
- Country: United States
- State: New York
- County: Sullivan
- Elevation: 1,657 ft (505 m)
- Time zone: UTC-5 (Eastern (EST))
  - Summer (DST): UTC-4 (EDT)
- ZIP code: 12767
- Area code: 845
- GNIS feature ID: 959204

Obernburg is a hamlet in the town of Fremont, in Sullivan County, New York, United States. Obernburg has a post office with ZIP code 12767, which opened on September 14, 1885.

== Geography ==
The community is 5.9 miles (9.5 km) northwest of Jeffersonville.
