= Horace Cleveland =

American landscape architect (1814–1900)

Horace William Shaler Cleveland
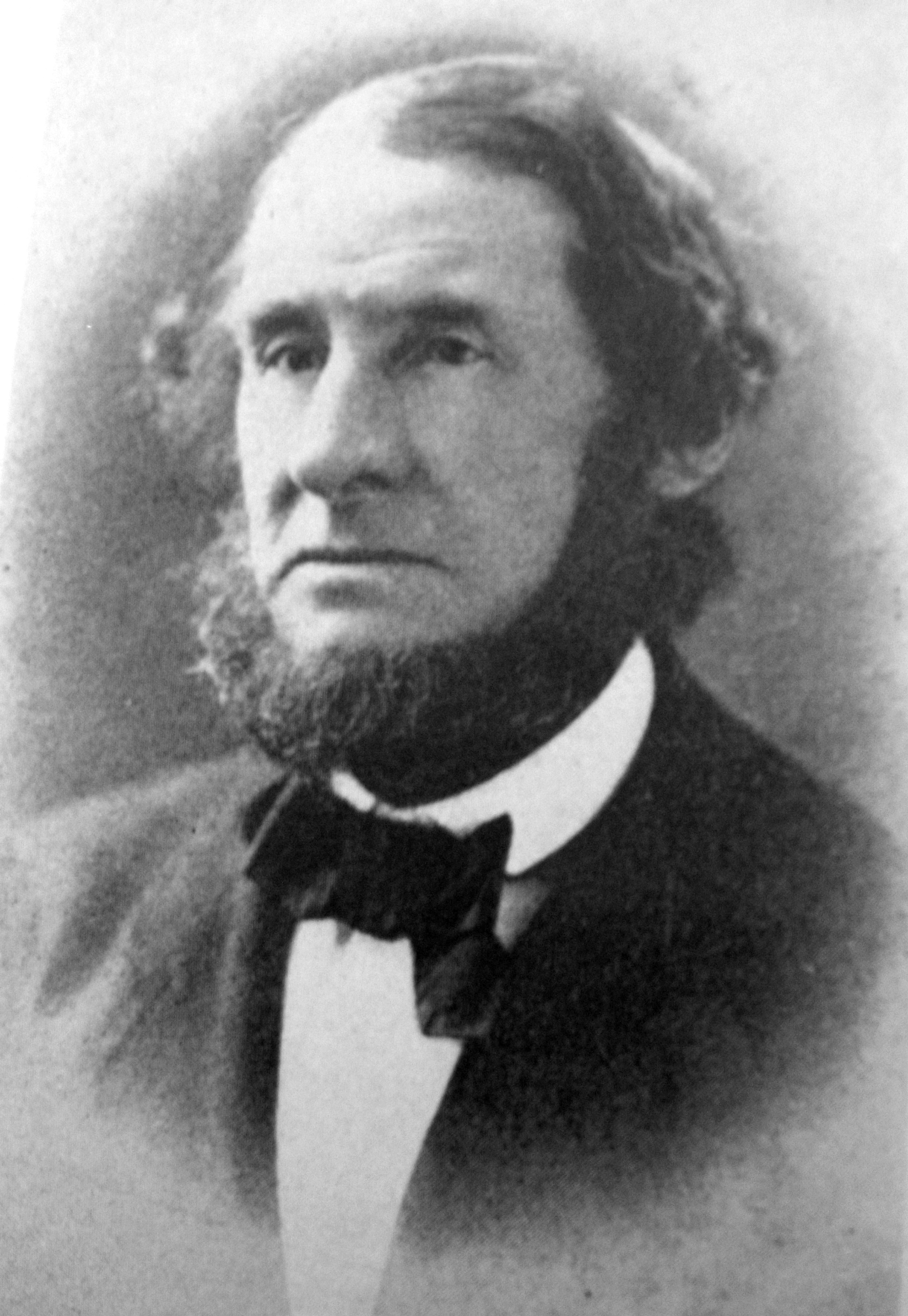
- Born: December 16, 1814; Lancaster, Massachusetts, U.S.
- Died: December 5, 1900 (aged 85); Hinsdale, Illinois, U.S.
- Burial place: Lakewood Cemetery
- Occupation: Landscape architect
- Practice: Cleveland and Copeland
- Projects: Sleepy Hollow Cemetery; Omaha Park and Boulevard System; Roger Williams Park; Saint Anthony Park; Oak Grove Cemetery; University of Minnesota campus

Horace William Shaler Cleveland (December 16, 1814 – December 5, 1900) was an American landscape architect. His approach to natural landscape design can be seen in projects such as the Grand Rounds in Minneapolis; Sleepy Hollow Cemetery in Concord, Massachusetts; the boulevard system in Omaha, Nebraska; Roger Williams Park in Providence, Rhode Island; and St. Anthony Park in Saint Paul, Minnesota.

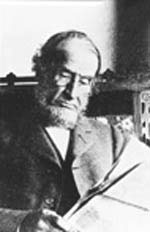
Horace William Shaler Cleveland

== Life ==
Horace William Shaler Cleveland was born to Richard Jeffry Cleveland and Dorcas Cleveland on December 16, 1814, in Lancaster, Massachusetts. Horace was later educated at the Lancaster School, a Unitarian school organized by his parents in accordance with the theories of Swiss educator Johann Heinrich Pestalozzi (1746–1827). The school emphasized frequent excursions for direct observation and study of nature through drawing and map-making. The family was socially linked to philosopher Ralph Waldo Emerson through Elizabeth Palmer Peabody, Horatio Greenough, and one of Emerson's cousins. As a result, Transcendentalism strongly influenced Cleveland's upbringing.

In the late 1820s Richard Cleveland moved his family to Cuba, where Horace's father served as Vice-Consul in Havana. Horace returned to the United States in the 1830s. During this time he was employed as a railroad surveyor in Illinois. While in Illinois, Cleveland studied civil engineering. A few years later, in the late 1830s, Cleveland returned to Massachusetts.

In 1841 Cleveland left Massachusetts to purchase a farm on the Delaware River in Burlington, New Jersey, where he became a scientific farmer. He joined horticultural societies, and became corresponding secretary of the New Jersey Horticultural Society. Cleveland also wrote articles for the Horticulturist, a periodical edited by renowned landscape gardener, architect, and horticulturist Andrew Jackson Downing (Wilson).

In 1854, at the age of 40, Cleveland returned to Massachusetts to establish the Cleveland and Copeland landscape practice in Boston with partner Robert Morris Copeland. Their first job was the design of the State Farm at Westborough, Massachusetts, followed by Cleveland's first major design, Sleepy Hollow Cemetery in Concord, Massachusetts (1855). The town report in Concord shows they were paid $75 for their work on the cemetery. Cleveland also assisted in the design of Boston's park spaces, emphasizing his famous concepts of open spaces and interconnected byways.

In 1857 Cleveland and Copeland entered a competition to be the designers for Central Park in New York. They lost the competition to another duo, landscape architect Fredrick Law Olmsted and his partner, Calvert Vaux, an architect. Cleveland's and Copeland's design of Central Park was not unlike that of Olmsted and Vaux's. "In a pamphlet accompanying his design Cleveland wrote, 'The tract of land selected for the Central Park comprises such an extensive area and such variety of surface as to afford opportunity for the construction of a work which shall surpass everything of its kind in the world ...'. Cleveland, like Olmsted, prescribed broad lawns, undulating surfaces, clothed with the rich verdure, dotted here and there with graceful trees and bounded by projecting capes and islands of wood ...'" (Oxford). Later in 1857, Cleveland designed Eastwood Cemetery (1872) in Lancaster, Massachusetts, with his son. Cleveland and Copeland parted ways during the Civil War when Copeland joined the war. After the war Copeland started his own practice which continued to grow till his death in 1872.

Cleveland moved to Chicago in 1869 and opened his own landscaping firm. Throughout his career he designed major parks and private landscapes in Illinois, Minneapolis, and throughout the Midwest. This included Highland Park, Illinois (1869). In 1872, Cleveland was retained by the city of Chicago to rebuild South Park, originally designed by Frederick Law Olmsted and Calvert Vaux, after the great Chicago fire. Cleveland wrote his landscaping guide, Landscape Architecture as Applied to the Wants of the West, in 1873 and was afterward hired by William Rainey Marshall to design Saint Anthony Park, a neighborhood in Saint Paul, Minnesota.

From 1878 until his death in 1900, Horace Cleveland not only completely revised the park systems of Minneapolis and St. Paul, but lent his extensive knowledge of landscaping to numerous projects, completing his last major project, landscaping for the campus at the University of Minnesota, in 1892. He died on December 5, 1900, in Hinsdale, Illinois. He was buried in Lakewood Cemetery.

== Philosophy ==
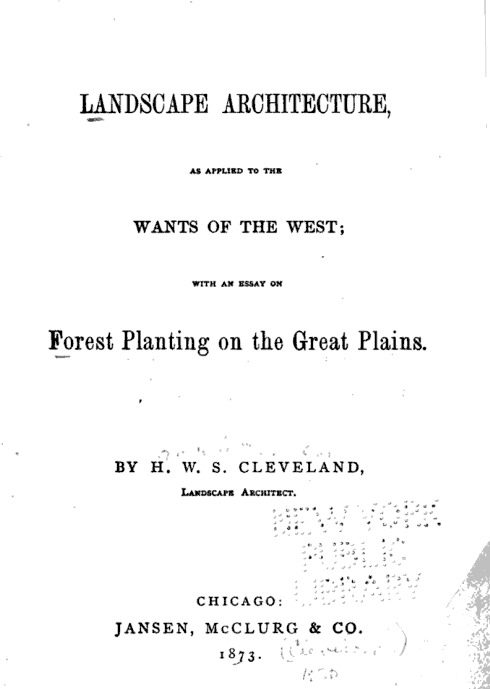
The cover of Cleveland's Landscape Architecture As Applied to the Wants of the West

Cleveland was a preservationist by nature, respecting the natural landscape features around him and shunning unnecessary decoration. Believing that a growing population would make open spaces like parks all the more valuable and desirable, Cleveland wrote that, to be successful in the landscape architecture field, one must "Look forward a century, to the time when the city has a population of a million, and think what will be their wants." Essentially, he believed that a good landscape architect should look to the future in order to design sustainable landscapes in the here and now, and that landscape architects should speak openly against the destruction of natural landscapes, to make sure that they would be available for future generations to enjoy.

Cleveland was a believer of using the existing topography and existing plants to keep his designs as natural as possible. In 1881 Cleveland wrote a book entitled A Few Words on the Arrangement of Rural Cemeteries. In his book, Cleveland wrote critically of cemetery layouts. He wrote, "without the least regard to topographical features, or the opportunities for tasteful effects which the natural position may afford." In his 1880s design for the grounds of the Jekyll Island Club, Cleveland promised Club owners a "style of severe simplicity," but this simplicity would be "the result of careful study" aimed at turning the Club grounds into "a Natural Paradise." With this goal in mind, Cleveland laid out lots and roads so as not to disturb "the favored haunts of deer and wild fowl" and stressing the preservation of native vegetation.

In addition, he believed that designs for public projects should not be limited by the financial or physical means of the designer or the commissioner. He theorized that, when the proposition of a new park or parkway came about, natural opposition was to be expected from the public. He knew this because he understood that the general populace saw outdoor city projects as a source of needless taxation for them, and that they did not believe that they could benefit from a public park in the same capacity as the wealthy. Eliminating this belief and creating parks that were meant to be enjoyed by all became one of Cleveland's most important endeavors.

In 1873 Cleveland wrote Landscape Architecture As Applied to the Wants of the West. This book is known as one of the first definitive attempts to describe on a broader scope the profession of landscape architecture. In its preface he wrote:

The term “Landscape Architecture” is objectionable, as being only figuratively expressive of the art it is used to designate. I make use of it, under protest, as the readiest means of making myself understood, in the absence of a more appropriate term. If the art is ever developed to the extent I believe to be within its legitimate limits, it will achieve for itself a name worthy of its position. Until it does so, it is idle to attempt to exalt it in the world’s estimation, by giving it a high-sounding title.

== Major landscape projects ==
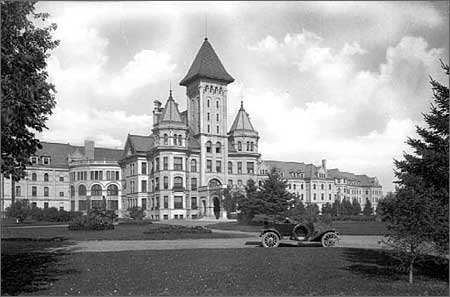
The Fergus Falls State Hospital's exterior, circa 1915

In the 1880s, Cleveland was hired by the Minneapolis Board of Park Commissioners to create a series of parks and interconnected parkways to connect and preserve existing natural features in and near the city. The parkways along the Mississippi River gorge were his main interest, but his plan also showed parkway boulevards across town and around one of the lakes in South Minneapolis, Lake Harriet. These grand parkways would increase property values, connect larger parks, drive up the desire for private development, and hopefully increase general revenues in the city over time. This vision was expanded by subsequent park commissioners and superintendents to encircle a series of lakes, now known as the Chain of Lakes, and to follow Minnehaha Creek to Minnehaha Falls. The result of Cleveland's vision is the famous “Grand Rounds,” an interconnected series of parkways, and parks, centered on the Mississippi River. The official title “Grand Rounds,” came much later, but Cleveland's vision for the scenic byway is timeless, and the Minneapolis Grand Rounds are known today as one of the best urban park systems in the world. Plans for a similar system in St. Paul, would have connected it to the Minneapolis system, but they were never completed, with the exception of the parkways along the Mississippi River. In 2017, the City of St. Paul began a several year project to complete its Grand Rounds system.

In 1889, the park commissioners for the city of Omaha sought Cleveland's advice in designing a large park in the center of the city. Cleveland stated that the center of any large park system, including the one intended for this city, should include a “great central park” that blocked the sights and sounds of the city. Cleveland advised that the park commissioners purchase a lot no less than 50 acres (200,000 m^{2}) in size, and that it should be situated many miles away from the heavily populated city districts.

Other major projects included:

- 1854: Cleveland partners with Robert Morris Copeland. Cleveland and Copeland design Oak Grove Cemetery in Gloucester, Massachusetts.
- 1855: Cleveland and Copeland design Sleepy Hollow Cemetery in Concord, Massachusetts.
- 1873: Cleveland receives honorary professorship title. Although he never attended any university, his own educational and professional knowledge led to his being addressed as “Professor H. Cleveland.” Cleveland publishes Landscape Architecture as Applied to the Wants of the West.
- 1878: Designed the Roger Williams Park/New England Botanical Gardens in Providence, Rhode Island. Designed the Cleveland Arboretums in Cleveland, Ohio. Designed Minnehaha Park in Minneapolis.
- 1881: Cleveland publishes A Few Words on the Arrangement of Rural Cemeteries.
- 1886: Created the Blackstone Boulevard in Providence, Rhode Island, which connected Blackstone Park, Butler Hospital, and the Swan Point Cemetery.
- 1886: Designed a landscape plan for the Jekyll Island Club, on Jekyll Island, Georgia. A winter resort for northeastern millionaires designed to stress natural simplicity.
- 1890s: Designed the landscaping for the Fergus Falls State Hospital in Fergus Falls, Minnesota and the Dwight D. Eisenhower Veterans Affairs Medical Center in Leavenworth, Kansas.
- 1892: Landscaped the campus for the University of Minnesota. Designed the parks and boulevards system in Omaha, Nebraska that still guides the city today.
- 1898: Cleveland presents a paper on "The Influence of Parks on the Character of Children."

== Social movements and influence over time ==
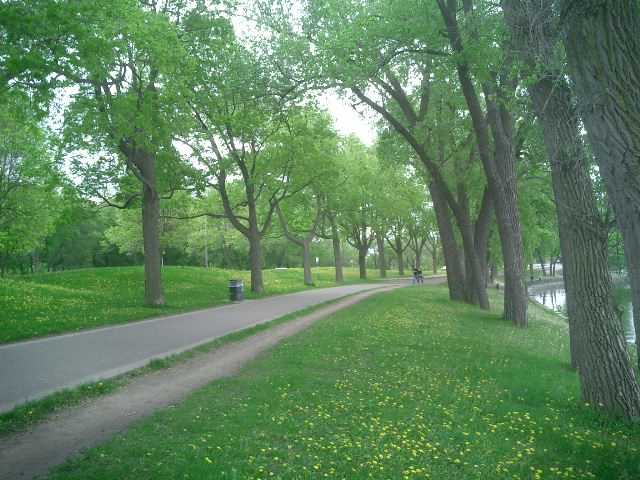
A path on Minneapolis's Grand Rounds

Cleveland's most important social movement could arguably be his contribution to the Minneapolis park systems. In lending his unique touch to these parks and scenic byways, Cleveland established a park system that embodied his philosophy of open spaces, naturalistic design, and the importance of preserving these public spaces for future generations. In the words of Cleveland himself: “They [the wealthy elite] will have wealth enough to purchase all that money can buy, but all their wealth cannot purchase a lost opportunity, or restore natural features of grandeur and beauty, which would then possess priceless value…” In this way, Cleveland inspired future generations of landscape architects to think before tearing down the natural landscape.

In addition, he stated that landscape architecture involved not just “decorating” the landscape, but that it was a landscape architect's duty to design parks, residential and commercial landscapes always with careful consideration to the environment around them and to be ever mindful of how future generations would make use of them. It is evident that Horace Cleveland contributed much to the future of landscape architecture and to the pursuit for a more naturalistic landscape concept.

Cleveland's designs in the mid-to-late 19th century shaped the future of all park systems for Minneapolis and St. Paul. Metropolitan Council Chair Peter Bell reflected on the contributions of Horace Cleveland: “Imagine this metropolitan area had it not been for the Minneapolis Board of Park Commissioners and landscape architect Horace Cleveland. Their vision 100 years ago helped create a network of scenic drives, parks and river boulevards along the lakes and rivers in Minneapolis and St. Paul, now recognized as one of the best urban park systems in the world.”

== Publications ==
- Cleveland, Horace William Shaler (1864). Hints to Riflemen. New York.
- Cleveland, Horace William Shaler (1873). Landscape Architecture As Applied to the Wants of the West. Chicago.
- Cleveland, Richard Jeffry; Cleveland, Horace William Shaler (1886). Voyages of a Merchant Navigator. New York.
