= Hankins District No. One Schoolhouse =

- U.S. National Register of Historic Places
- Location within New York Location within the United States
- Location: Sullivan Cty Rd. 132, Hankins, New York
- Coordinates: 41°48′59″N 75°4′58″W
- Area: less than one acre
- Built: 1845
- Architectural style: Mid 19th Century Revival
- MPS: Upper Delaware Valley, New York and Pennsylvania MPS
- NRHP reference No.: 00000054
- Added to NRHP: February 4, 2000

Hankins District No. One Schoolhouse is a historic one-room school located at Hankins in Sullivan County, New York. It was built about 1845.

It was added to the National Register of Historic Places in 2000.
