= Riverside Cemetery (Long Eddy, New York) =

Historic cemetery in New York, United States

- U.S. National Register of Historic Places
- Location within New York Location within the United States
- Nearest city: Long Eddy, New York
- Coordinates: 41°50′50″N 75°7′36″W
- Area: 2 acres (0.81 ha)
- Architectural style: Queen Anne
- MPS: Upper Delaware Valley, New York and Pennsylvania MPS
- NRHP reference No.: 93001226
- Added to NRHP: November 18, 1993

Riverside Cemetery is a historic rural cemetery located at Long Eddy in Sullivan County, New York. It was established in 1885 and contains about 550 markers through 1943. Located in the cemetery is a frame, Queen Anne style chapel, bluestone sidewalk, and wrought iron fence.

It was added to the National Register of Historic Places in 1993.
