= Fremont Center, New York =

- Hamlet
- Location within New York Location within the United States
- Coordinates: 41°50′32″N 75°02′35″W
- Country: United States
- State: New York
- County: Sullivan
- Elevation: 1,240 ft (380 m)
- Time zone: UTC-5 (Eastern (EST))
  - Summer (DST): UTC-4 (EDT)
- ZIP code: 12736
- Area code: 845
- GNIS feature ID: 950682

Fremont Center is a hamlet in Sullivan County, New York, United States. The community is 7.1 miles (11.4 km) northwest of Jeffersonville. Fremont Center has a post office with ZIP code 12736.
