= Hillside Cemetery (Clarendon, New York) =

Historic cemetery in New York, United States

- U.S. National Register of Historic Places
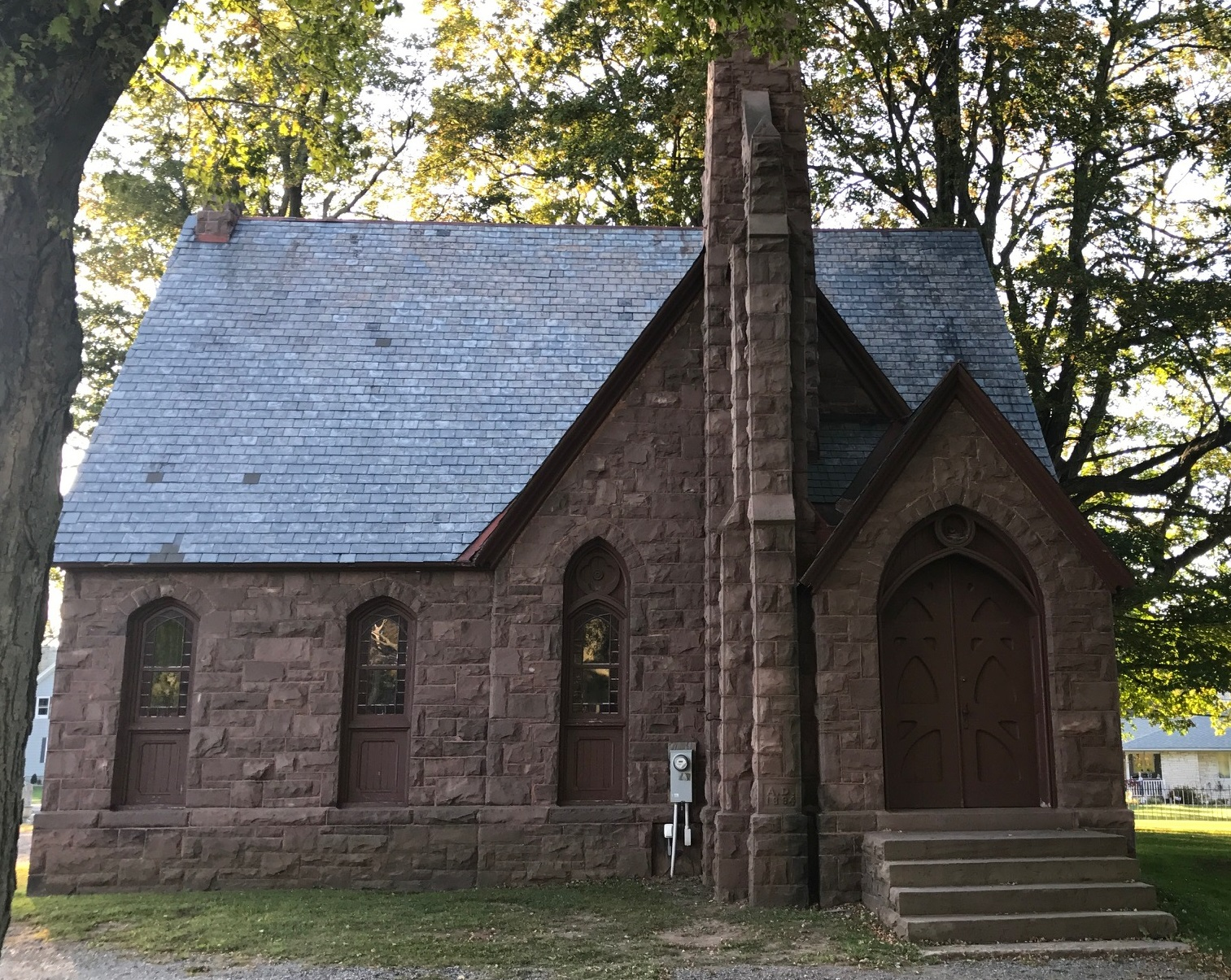

- Location within New York Location within the United States
- Location: NY 237 & S. Holley Rd., Clarendon, New York
- Coordinates: 43°12′57″N 78°01′54″W
- Area: 30.16 acres (12.21 ha)
- Built: 1866
- Built by: Nerville Cole
- Architect: Addison Forbes
- Architectural style: Gothic Revival
- MPS: Cobblestone Architecture of New York State MPS
- NRHP reference No.: 13000450
- Added to NRHP: June 25, 2013

Hillside Cemetery is a historic rural cemetery located at Clarendon in Orleans County, New York. The cemetery was established in 1866, and is the resting place of many early settlers. The cemetery includes a mortuary chapel built in 1894 in the Gothic Revival style and stucco over concrete storage building (1928). The last section of the cemetery was added in 1938.

It was listed on the National Register of Historic Places in 2013.

Medical pioneer Dr. Lemuel Whitley Diggs (1900–1995) is buried there. A cenotaph to conservationist and taxidermist Carl Ethan Akeley (1864–1926) is a large feature in the cemetery. [Lillian Bentham] (1892-1977) she is a titanic survivor.

== Gallery ==
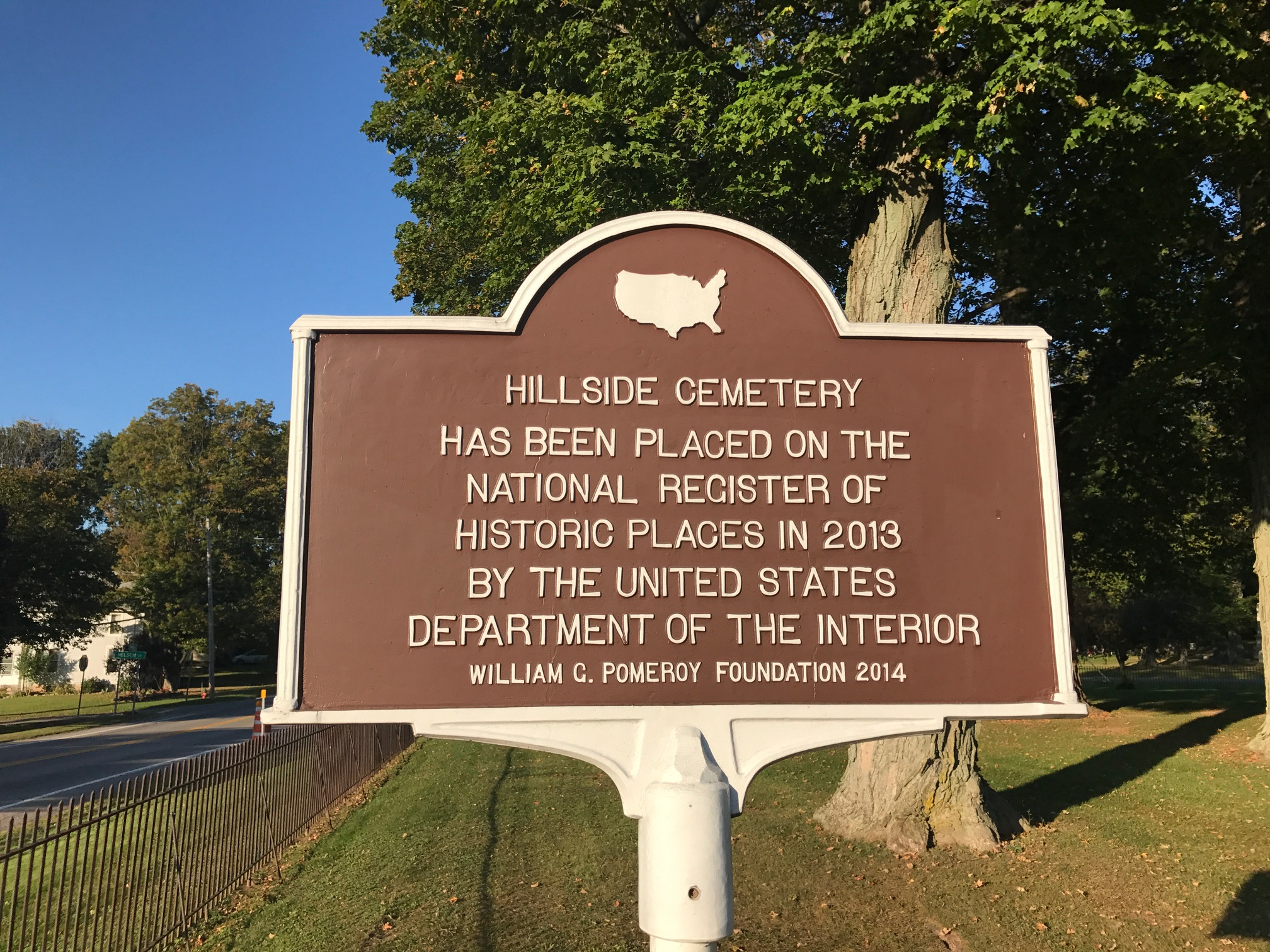
Hillside Cemetery Marker

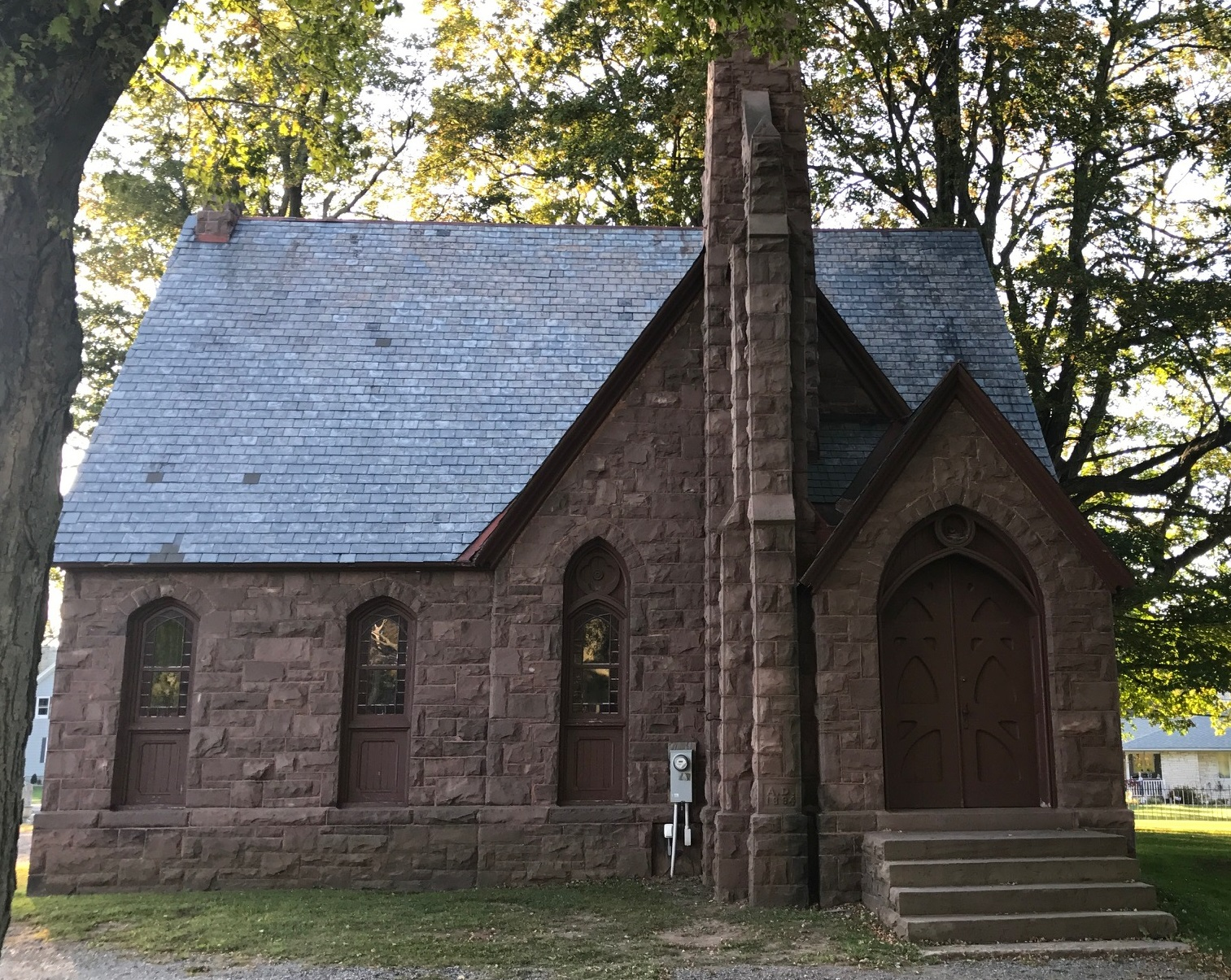
Hillside Cemetery Chapel – East Side

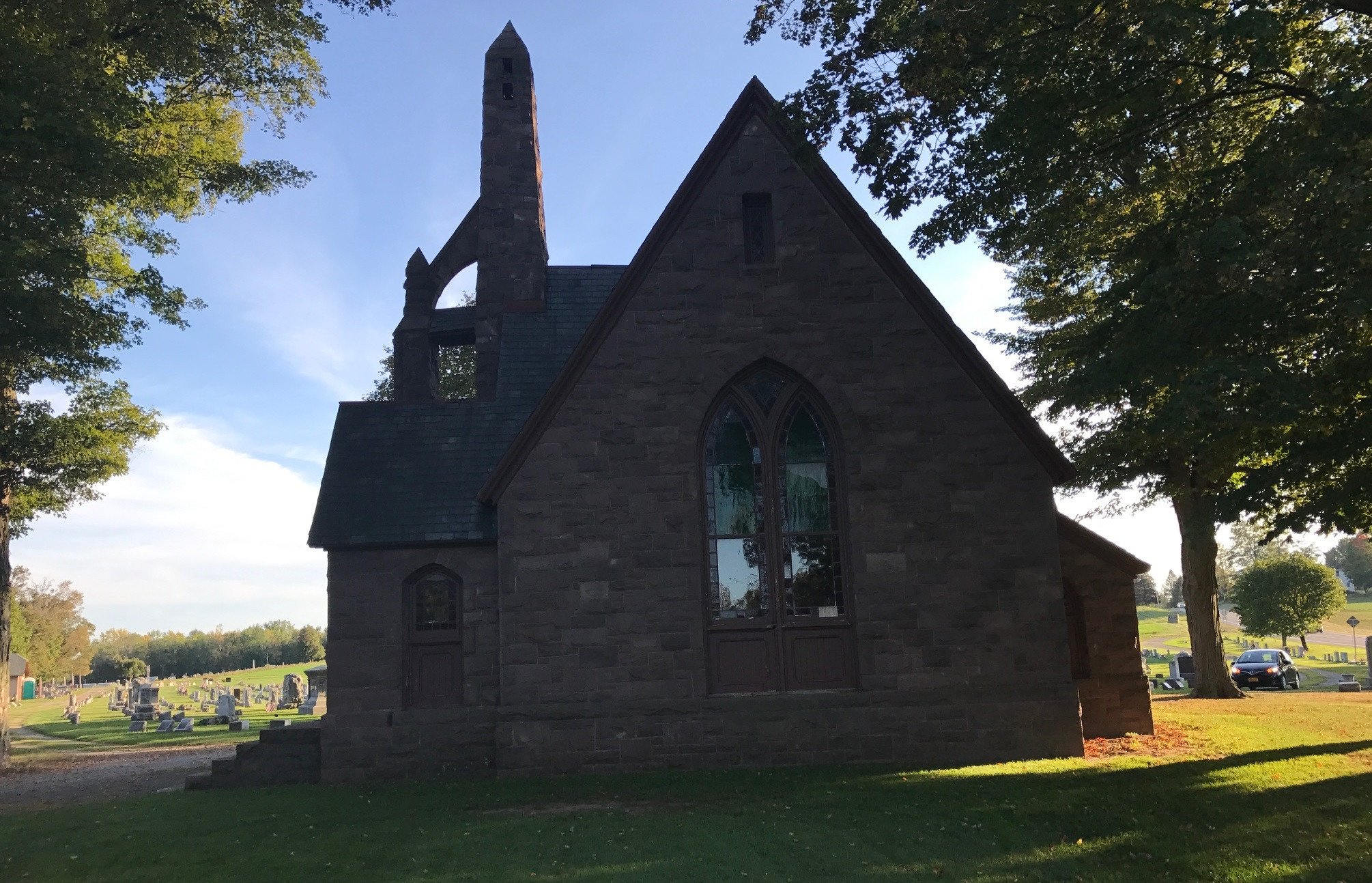
Hillside Cemetery Chapel – North Side

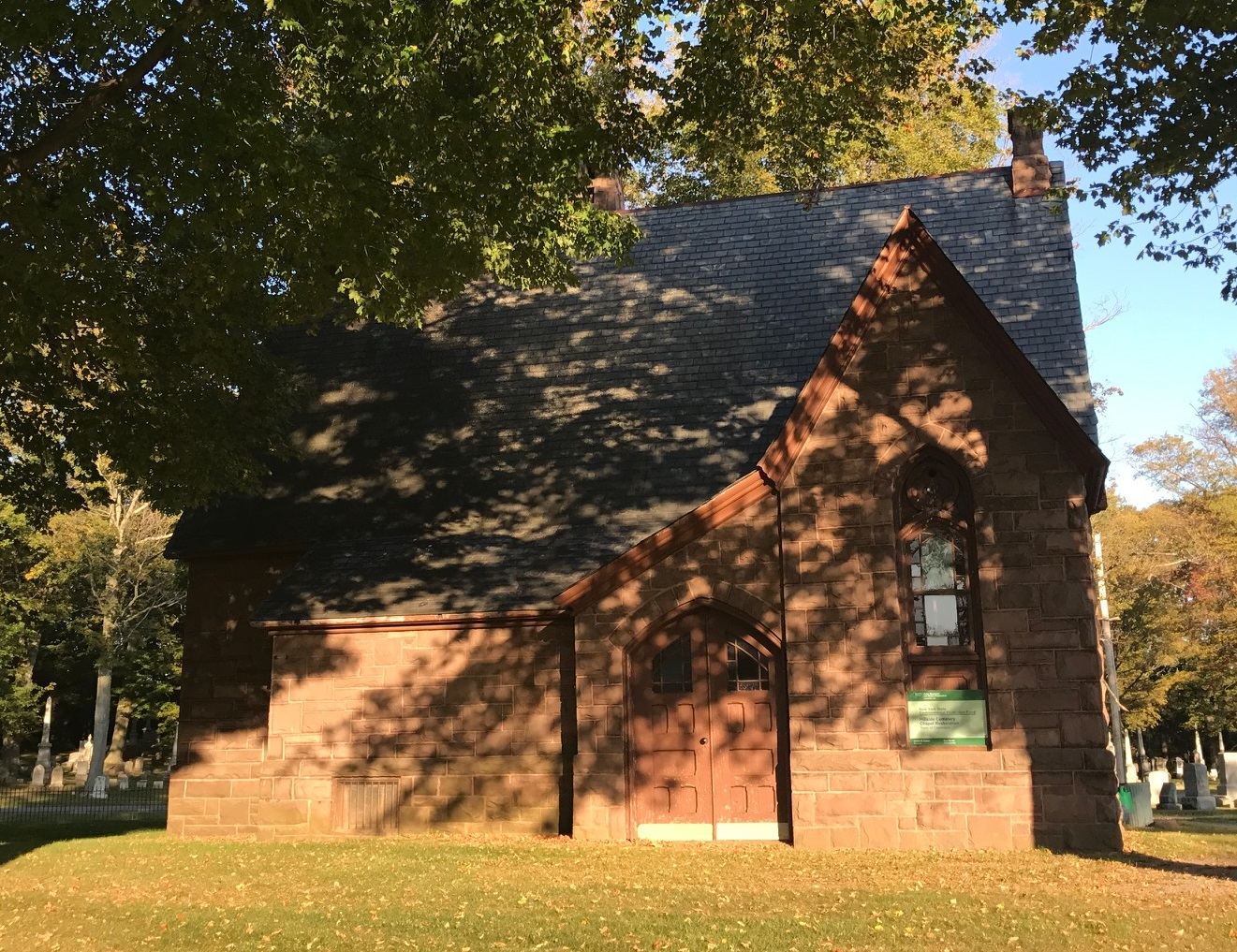
Hillside Cemetery Chapel – West Side
