= Oak Grove Cemetery (Gloucester, Massachusetts) =

Historic rural style cemetery in Essex County

- U.S. National Register of Historic Places
- U.S. Historic district
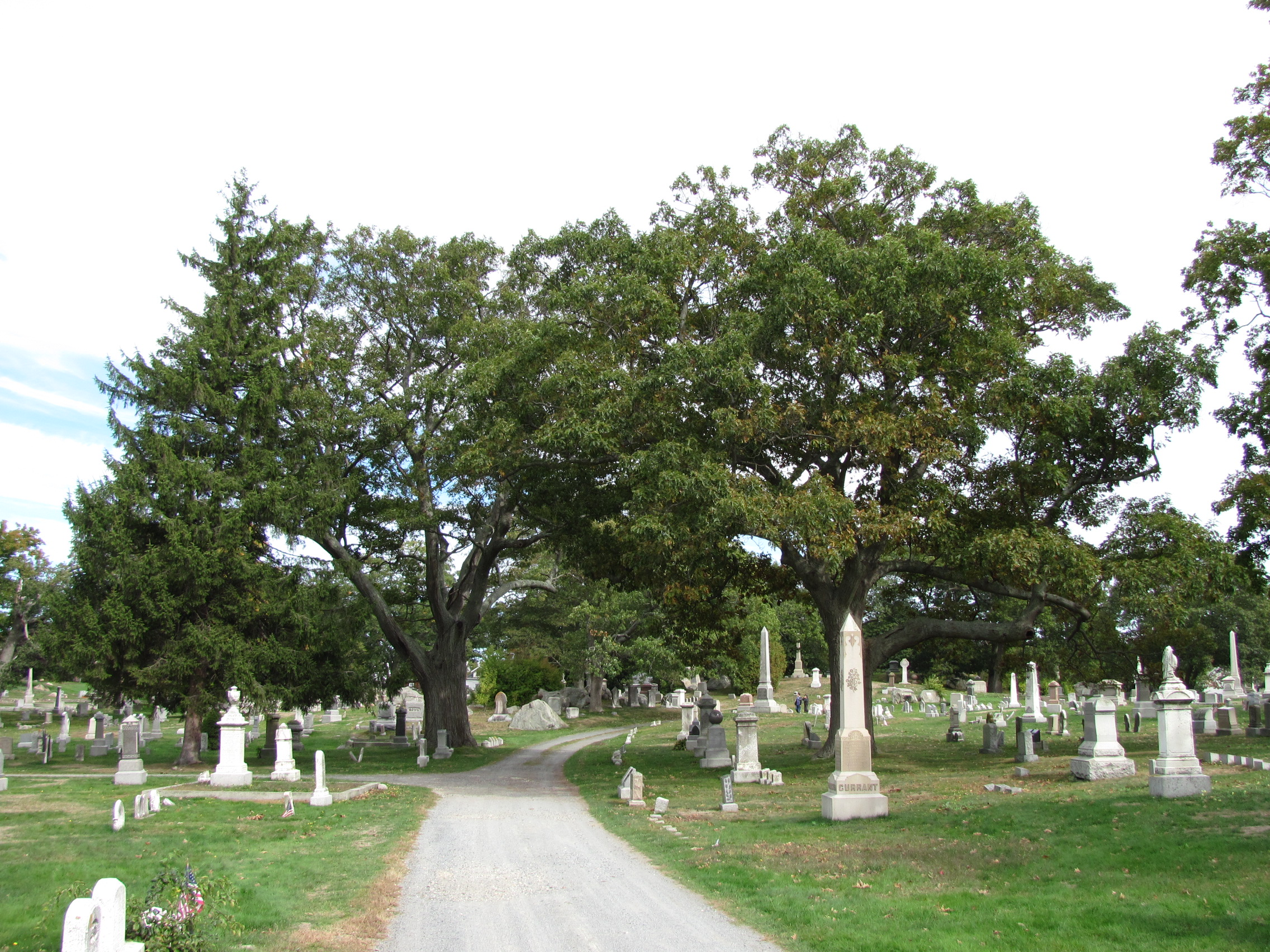
- Oak Grove Cemetery

- Location within Massachusetts Location within the United States
- Location: Gloucester, Massachusetts
- Coordinates: 42°37′10″N 70°40′14″W
- Area: 11 acres (4.5 ha)
- Built: 1854
- Architect: Cleveland, Horace William Shaler; Copeland, Robert Morris
- Architectural style: Romanesque
- NRHP reference No.: 75000263
- Added to NRHP: April 3, 1975

The Oak Grove Cemetery is a historic cemetery, founded in 1854, which is bounded by Derby, Washington, and Grove Sts., and Maplewood Avenue in Gloucester, Massachusetts, United States. The cemetery was founded by a group of local businessmen who sought to establish a cemetery in the then-fashionable rural cemetery style. They hired landscape architects Robert Morris Copeland and Horace William Shaler Cleveland to lay out a series of winding lanes. The Bradford Chapel was built through a bequest by George R. Bradford, another local businessman, and built in 1903–04. The cemetery is still privately owned, and has grown over time to occupy 11 acres (4.5 ha).

It is the burial place of the operatic soprano Emma Abbott.

The cemetery was listed on the National Register of Historic Places in 1975.

== See also ==
- National Register of Historic Places listings in Gloucester, Massachusetts
- National Register of Historic Places listings in Essex County, Massachusetts
