= Mount Feake Cemetery =

Historic cemetery in Massachusetts, United States

- U.S. National Register of Historic Places
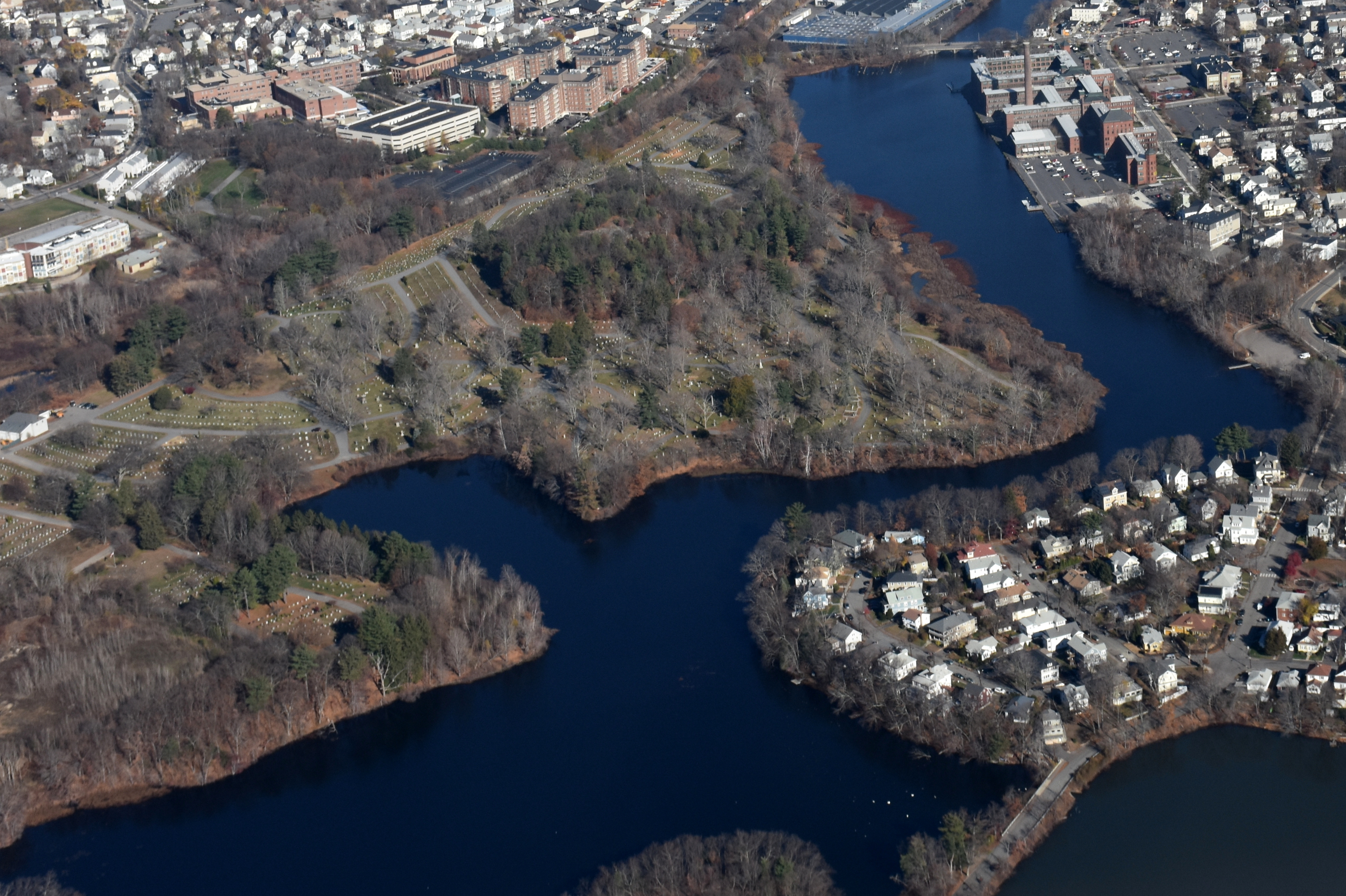
- Mount Feake Cemetery along the Charles River

- Location within Massachusetts Location within the United States
- Location: 203 Prospect St., Waltham, Massachusetts
- Coordinates: 42°21′52″N 71°14′58″W
- Area: 85 acres (34 ha)
- Built: 1857
- Architect: Robert Morris Copeland
- Architectural style: Italianate, Romanesque
- MPS: Waltham MRA
- NRHP reference No.: 89001497
- Added to NRHP: September 28, 1989

Mount Feake Cemetery is a historic cemetery at 203 Prospect Street in Waltham, Massachusetts.

== History ==
Established in 1857, it is the city's second cemetery, after Grove Hill Cemetery, and is one of the best-preserved garden cemeteries in the state. It takes its name from its highest point, Mount Feake, which was named by Governor John Winthrop in 1632 for his future nephew-in-law, Robert Feake, one of the founding settlers of Watertown, Massachusetts. The cemetery was listed on the National Register of Historic Places in 1989.

Mount Feake Cemetery was designed by Robert Morris Copeland, and was from its inception compared to the older Mount Auburn Cemetery in Cambridge. It stands on a somewhat rugged parcel of land that rises above the Charles River across from the Waltham Watch Company complex. A series of winding lanes, designed to complement the terrain, provide access to all parts of the cemetery. Most of the grave markers are made of granite, although marble and limestone are also well-represented.

One unusual item once added some romantic charm to the cemetery. The remains of a brick water pumping station, built in 1872 and enlarged in 1896-97, stood on the grounds of the cemetery, and provided a picturesque ruin to the environment. Adjacent to this building stood two Italianate houses, as well as a carriage house and sheds, that were historically associated with the pumping station. All of these buildings were demolished, probably in the late 20th century.

== Notable burials ==
Notable burials include Marta Adams (1891–1978).

== Images ==
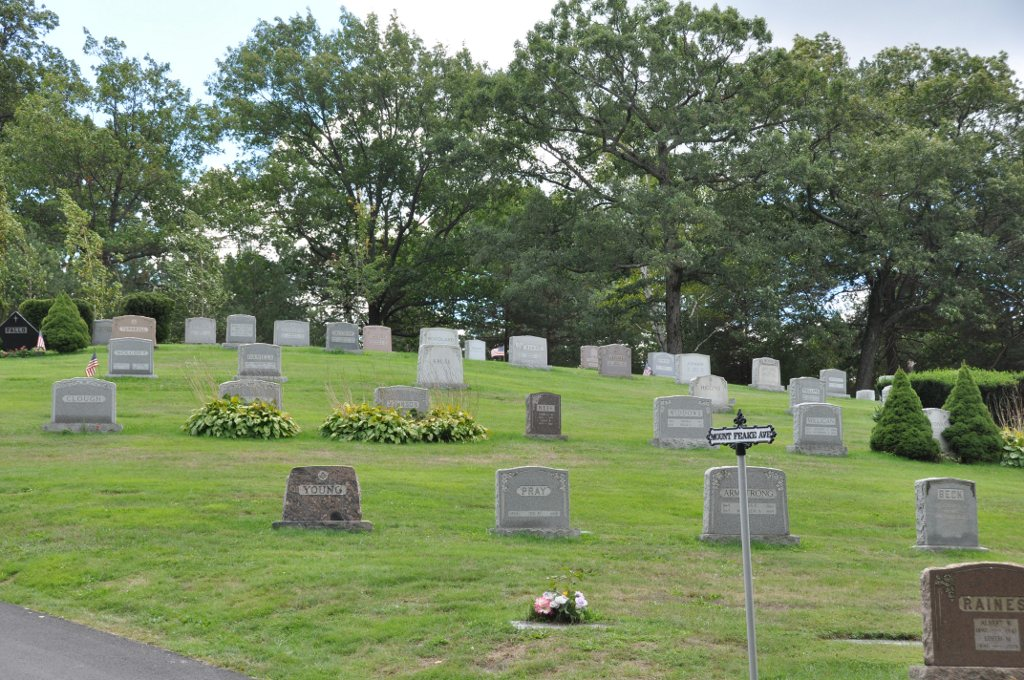
Headstones in Mount Feake Cemetery.

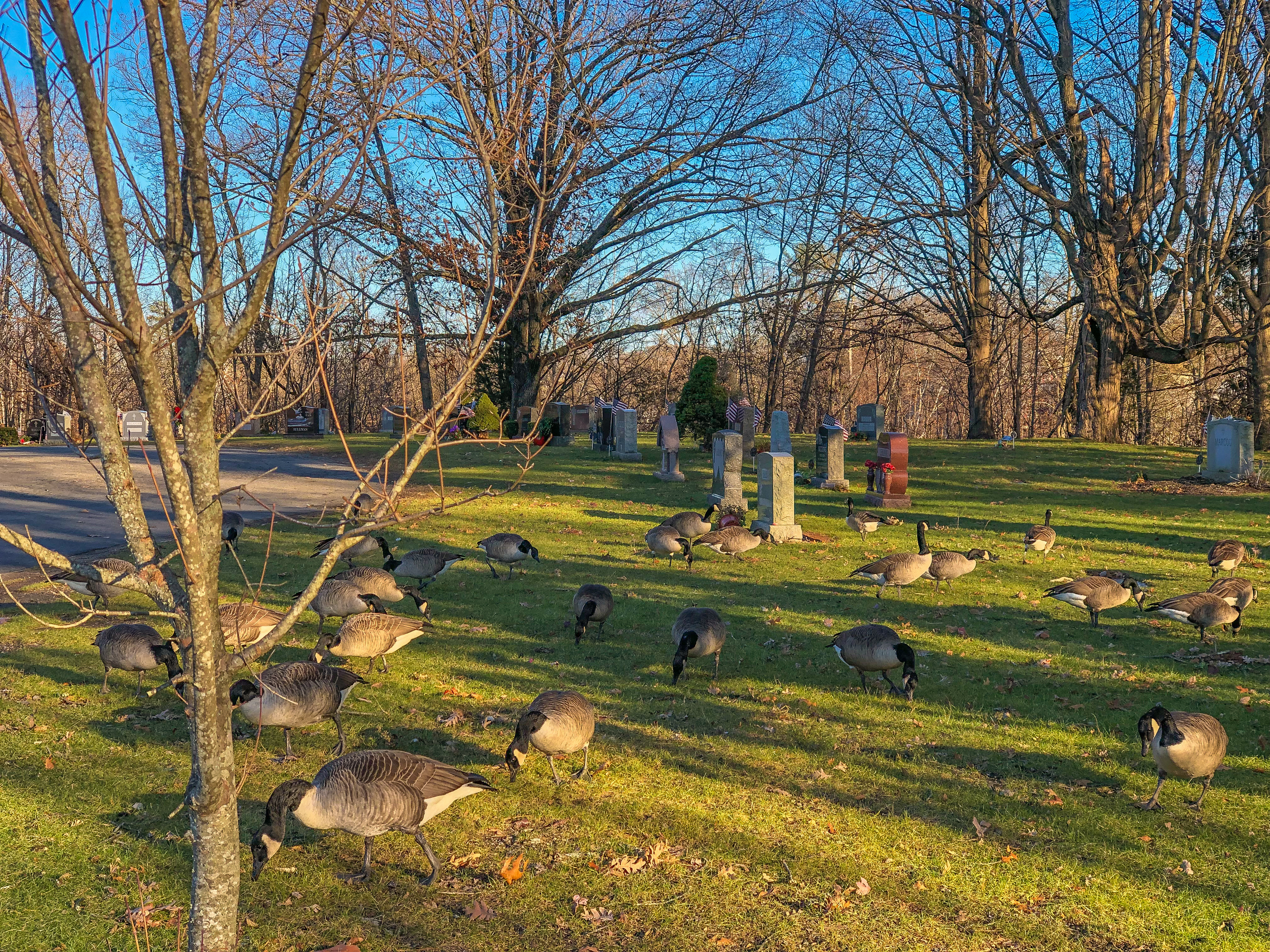
Canada geese grazing in the grass at Mount Feake Cemetery.

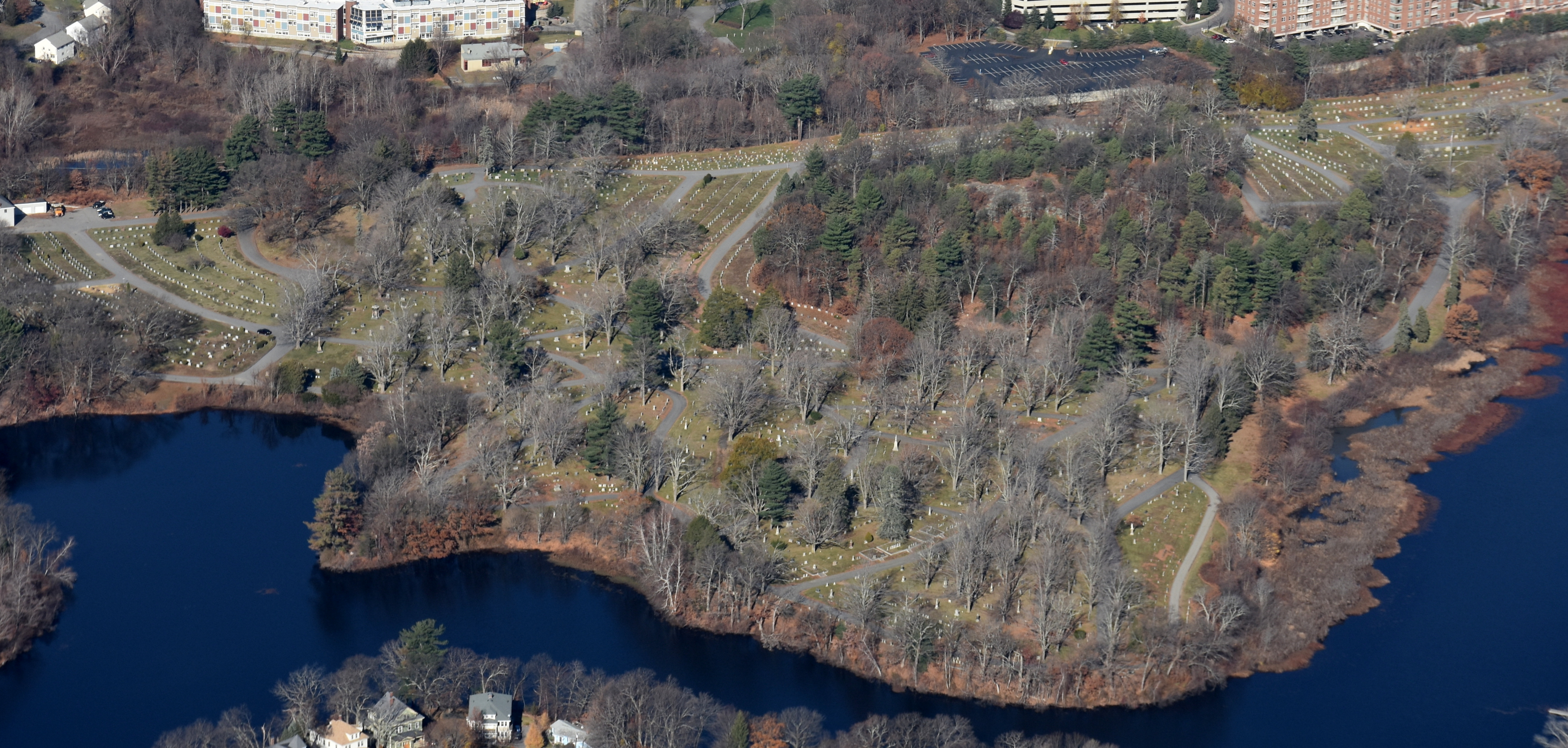
Aerial view of Mount Feake Cemetery.

== See also ==
- National Register of Historic Places listings in Waltham, Massachusetts
