= AltCar Expo =

Coordinates: 34.009080°N 118.489337°W

AltCar Expo is the alternative energy and transportation expo in Santa Monica Civic Auditorium.

Admission is free.

In the 2008 Expo (September 26 and 27), the Chevrolet Volt prototype was seen by more than 15,000 people in Santa Monica at AltCar Expo.

This expo went virtual since 2020.

== Exhibitors ==
- A123 Systems/Hymotion
- AC Propulsion
- Advanced Battery Systems
- American Custom Golf Cars
- American Honda Motor Company
- Ample
- Austin Energy
- Bad Boy Buggies
- Batteries Plus
- Better World Club
- Big Blue Bus
- California Department of Consumer Affairs
- California Green Designs
- California Energy Commission
- Canadian Electric Vehicles
- City of Santa Monica, Environmental Programs Division
- City of Santa Monica, Green Building Programs
- Coulomb Technologies
- Columbia Par Car
- Department of Consumer Affairs
- Earth Friendly Moving
- EcoLimo
- Elite Power Solutions, LLC
- e-ride Industries
- EF9 Energy Systems
- Electrorides
- Electric Blue Motors
- Euro Taxi
- Free Drive-Ev Inc
- General Motors
- Gimm Inc.
- Global Green
- Green Depot
- Green Earth Electric Vehicles
- Hi-Performance Golf Cars, Inc
- International Environmental Solutions
- Invest Green
- Jungle Motors
- Los Angeles County Bike Coalition (LACBC)
- Los Angeles Times
- Might-e-truck
- Miles Electric Vehicles
- National Biodiesel Board
- Petersen Automotive Museum
- Plug In America
- Plug in Partners
- Prometheus Systems
- REC Solar
- Rent A Green Box
- Revolution USA
- Roush Industries Inc.
- Santa Monica Ford
- Segway, Los Angeles
- Skeuter
- Society of Automotive Engineers
- Solar Santa Monica
- South Coast Air Quality Management District
- Southern California Edison
- Southern California Transit Advocates (abbreviated So. California Transit Advocates)
- States Logistics Service Inc.
- Sustainable Transport Club
- Sustainable Works
- Studio MFT, INC
- T3 Motion, Inc., Inc.
- Taxi! Taxi!
- Tellurian BioDiesel, Inc.
- The Bikerowave
- The Electric Car Company of Long Beach
- The Transit Coalition
- Tom's Truck Center
- Toyota
- TrioBike
- Union of Concerned Scientists
- Vantage Vehicle International, Inc.
- Zero Motorcycles

== See also ==
- Alternative propulsion
