= David S. Barry =

American journalist

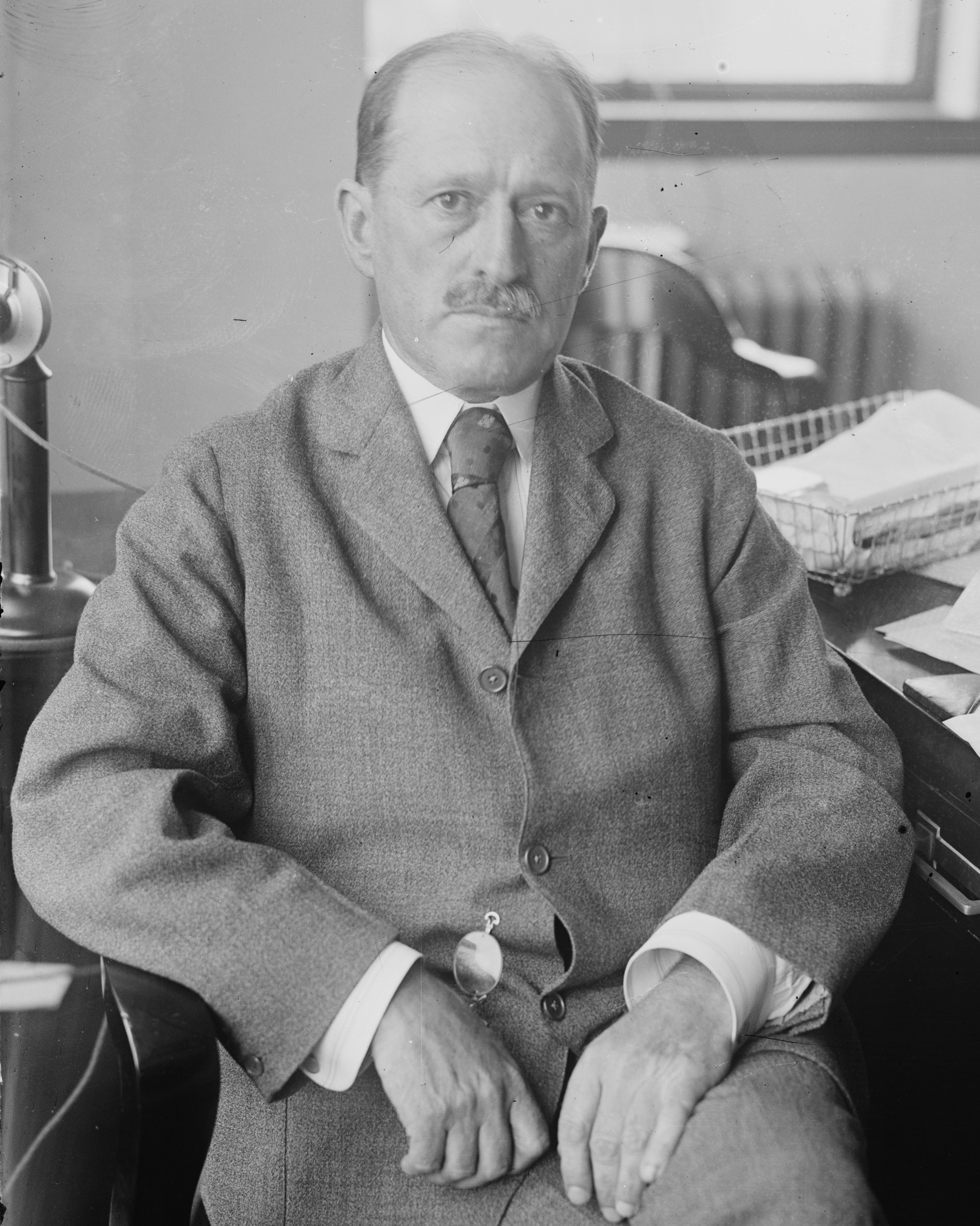
- Barry in 1916
- Born: David Sheldon Barry; May 25, 1859
- Died: February 10, 1936 (aged 76)
- Children: David S. Barry. Jr.

David Sheldon Barry Sr. (May 25, 1859 – February 10, 1936) was an American journalist who became the 17th Sergeant at Arms of the United States Senate, serving from 1919 to 1933.

Barry's first-hand experience of politics began at the age of twelve as a page in the Michigan Legislature, where he served from 1871 to 1873, going on to become a United States Senate Page in 1875. He then entered a career in journalism which included stints as Washington correspondent for Detroit's Post and Tribune, editor-in-chief of The Providence Journal (1904–1906) and Washington bureau chief for The New York Sun, where he was known as a strong supporter of Theodore Roosevelt. He drew upon his experiences as a Washington correspondent for his 1924 book, Forty Years in Washington.

Barry was appointed Sergeant at Arms to the United States Senate in 1919, and was dismissed in 1933 after accusations that an article that he wrote for the journal New Outlook libelled the Senate with claims that some members were well known to sell their votes.

He was the father of Col. David S. Barry. Jr., an officer in the United States Marines, and great-grandfather of Julia Thorne and Ambassador David Thorne.

Political offices
Preceded by Charles P. Higgins	Sergeant at Arms of the United States Senate; 1919–1933	Succeeded by Chesley W. Jurney
