= David Thorne (diplomat) =

American diplomat

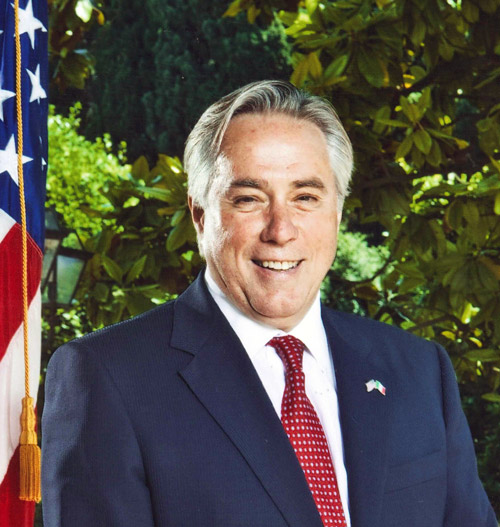

United States Ambassador to Italy United States Ambassador to San Marino
- In office September 4, 2009 – July 30, 2013
- President: Barack Obama
- Preceded by: Ronald Spogli
- Succeeded by: John Phillips

Personal details
- Born: David Hoadley Thorne; September 16, 1944 (age 82)
- Children: 2
- Relatives: Julia Thorne (twin sister); Alexandra Kerry (niece); Vanessa Kerry (niece)
- Education: Yale University (B.A.); Columbia University (M.S.)

Military service
- Allegiance: United States
- Branch/service: United States Navy
- Years of service: 1966–1970
- Battles/wars: Vietnam War

David Hoadley Thorne (born September 16, 1944) is an American businessman and diplomat who served as United States Ambassador to Italy and Ambassador to San Marino from 2009 to 2013. He was nominated by President Barack Obama and sworn in on August 17, 2009.

David Thorne's parents were Alice Smith (Barry) and Landon Ketchum Thorne Jr. David lived in Italy for a decade while his father helped administer the Marshall Plan. David's twin sister Julia was the first wife of John Kerry. Thorne graduated from Yale University in 1966 with a B.A. in American History, where he roomed with Kerry and both were members of Skull and Bones, and then from Columbia University in 1971 with a master's degree in journalism. He served in the United States Navy during the Vietnam War, and worked in political consulting, real estate development, and publishing. He is married and has two children.

== Honours and decorations ==
- Italy Knight Grand Cross of the Order of Merit of the Italian Republic on March 26, 2013

Diplomatic posts
Preceded by Ronald Spogli	United States Ambassador to Italy; 2009–2013	Succeeded by John Phillips
Preceded by Ronald Spogli	United States Ambassador to San Marino; 2009–2013	Succeeded by John Phillips
