= John K. Iglehart =

American medical journalist and editor

John K. Iglehart (July 29, 1939 - June 12, 2025) was the founding editor of Health Affairs. He was also the national correspondent of The New England Journal of Medicine. He held these two editorial leadership positions for 27 years.

== Education ==
Iglehart graduated from University of Wisconsin–Milwaukee with a B.S. in Journalism. He was also a journalist-in-residence at Harvard School of Public Health, and was a founding member of the National Academy of Social Insurance.

== Career ==
Iglehart was an elected member of the National Academy of Social Insurance and served on the advisory board of the National Institute For Health Care Management. He was an elected member in the Institute of Medicine of the United States National Academy of Sciences and served on its Governing Council between 1985 and 1991. He was also the board member of the American Board of Medical Specialties, the Educational Commission for Foreign Medical Graduates, and AcademyHealth.

In 2006, Iglehart was awarded the AcademyHealth Chair Award.

Iglehart held several editorial positions between 1969 and 1979. Before he founded Health Affairs, he was a vice president of the Kaiser Foundation Health Plan and director of its Washington, D.C. office.

In 1981, Iglehart founded a bimonthly peer-reviewed health care policy academic journal Health Affairs under the aegis of Project HOPE, a nonprofit international health education organization, leading it for 27 years. The journal was called "the bible of health policy" by Washington Post with more than 16 million online page views per year. He stepped down from the position on September 4, 2007, returning briefly in an interim role during 2013–14, and remained affiliated with the journal in an emeritus capacity.

Since 1981, Iglehart had also been the national correspondent of The New England Journal of Medicine and had written more than 100 essays.

== Legacy ==
In describing John's legacy as expressed through Health Affairs, Stanford economist Victor Fuchs once repeated Ralph Waldo Emerson's famous line from “Self-Reliance”: “An institution is the lengthened shadow of one man.” John leaves behind a remarkable legacy, not only in the lives that he touched in his own lifetime but also in the durability of his record of publications and the enduring commitment of the Health Affairs staff to the principles that guided him.
