= The Last Full Measure (2004 film) =

- Directed by: Alexandra Kerry
- Written by: Alexandra Kerry; Tracy Droz Tragos
- Produced by: Nina Leidersdorff
- Starring: Reiko Aylesworth; Xander Berkeley; Somah Haaland
- Cinematography: Michael Hansen
- Edited by: Vikash Patel
- Distributed by: American Film Institute (AFI)
- Release date: April 1, 2004
- Running time: 18 minutes
- Country: United States
- Language: English
- Budget: US $50,000 (estimated)

The Last Full Measure is a 2004 short film written and directed by Alexandra Kerry, daughter of U.S. Democratic Senator John Kerry. Set in 1973, during the Vietnam War, it explores the emotions of a nine-year-old girl awaiting her father's return from the war. The cast includes 24 stars Xander Berkeley and Reiko Aylesworth.

The title is drawn from the Gettysburg Address of President Abraham Lincoln.

== Cast ==
- Reiko Aylesworth as Mother
- Xander Berkeley
- Somah Haaland as Katherine
- Elsa Raven
- Daniel Stern
- Sam Trammell
- Jack Wallace
