= Bill Lann Lee =

American lawyer

Bill Lee
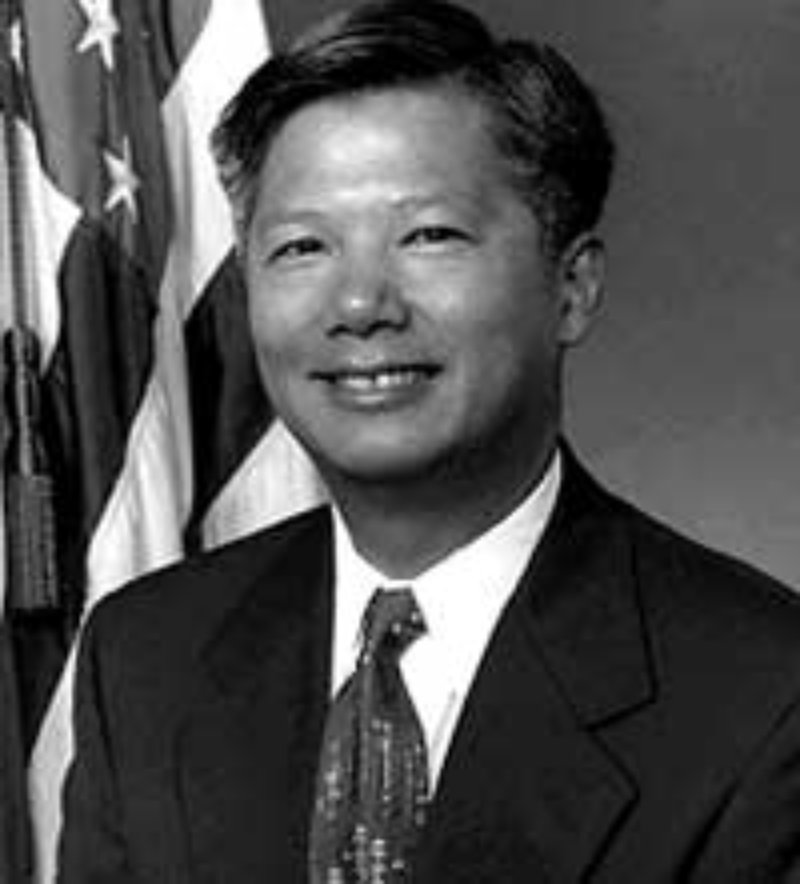

Assistant United States Attorney General for the Civil Rights Division
- In office December 15, 1997 – January 20, 2001; Acting: December 15, 1997 – August 4, 2000
- President: Bill Clinton
- Preceded by: Deval Patrick
- Succeeded by: Ralph Boyd

Personal details
- Born: February 5, 1949 (age 77) New York City, New York, U.S.
- Party: Democratic
- Spouse: Carolyn Yee
- Children: 3
- Education: Yale University (BA); Columbia University (JD)

Chinese name
- Chinese: 李亮畴
Transcriptions
Standard Mandarin
- Hanyu Pinyin: Lǐ Liàngchóu
Yue: Cantonese
- Jyutping: Lei^{5} Loeng^{6}cau^{4}

Bill Lann Lee (born February 5, 1949) is an American civil rights attorney who served as Assistant United States Attorney General for the Civil Rights Division for the United States Department of Justice Civil Rights Division under President Bill Clinton.

== Early life and education ==
Lee was born in New York City to Chinese immigrant parents. Lee's father William had only a sixth grade education and circumvented the Chinese Exclusion Act by detouring through Canada to enter the U.S. He owned a hand laundromat on the Upper West Side of Manhattan and enlisted in the United States Army Air Corps during World War II at age 35; still, he experienced racism such as taunting or being rejected for housing and jobs. Lee graduated from the Bronx High School of Science and attended Yale University on a scholarship. As an undergraduate at Yale, Lee majored in history and was elected to Phi Beta Kappa, graduating magna cum laude in 1971. In 1974, he earned his J.D. from Columbia Law School, where he was a Stone Scholar and won the Best Moot Court Prize.

== Civil rights career ==
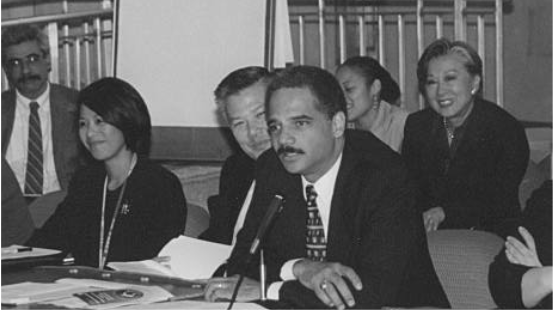
Bill Lann Lee with Deputy Attorney General Eric Holder, opening an Interagency Working Group meeting of the White House Initiative on Asian Americans and Pacific Islanders hosted by the Department of Justice on October 18, 2000.

While a law student, Lee worked as a research assistant for Jack Greenberg, Thurgood Marshall's successor at the NAACP Legal Defense and Educational Fund (LDF). After graduating from law school, he returned to the Legal Defense Fund and worked there as a civil rights attorney until 1982. While still affiliated with LDF, from 1979 - 1980, Lee served as counsel for the Asian American Legal Defense and Education Fund. He then moved to Los Angeles in 1983, where he was Supervising Attorney for Civil Rights Litigation at the Center for Law in the Public Interest until 1988. He then returned to the Legal Defense Fund to serve as the director of its Western Regional Office.

In 1997, President Bill Clinton nominated Lee to the nation's highest civil rights post – Assistant Attorney General for Civil Rights in the U.S. Department of Justice. His nomination, like Lani Guinier's before him, faced significant opposition from conservatives concerned with his views on affirmative action. Named by Clinton as acting assistant attorney general on December 15, 1997, Lee had a formal recess appointment to the position on August 4, 2000; he was never confirmed to this position by the Senate. Lee became the highest-ranking Asian-American in the Department of Justice, where he led successful efforts to strengthen the nation's hate crime laws, improve access and opportunities for Americans with disabilities, fight against housing discrimination, and spearheaded efforts to toughen laws against human trafficking and involuntary servitude.

Serving until the end of the Clinton White House despite the Senate's refusal to confirm him, Lee returned to Columbia Law School as a visiting scholar and wrote a report on international human rights for the Ford Foundation.

In November 2001, Lee accepted a position as a partner with the law firm of Lieff Cabraser, where he directed the firm's human rights practice and co-chaired the employment practice. In 2006, Lee left Lieff Cabraser to become a name partner at Lewis Feinberg Lee Renaker & Jackson in Oakland, California.

Continuing his civil rights work, Lee chaired the bipartisan National Commission on the Voting Rights Act, which compiled evidence for the successful extension of the Act in July 2006. He also chaired the Bar Association of San Francisco’s Task Force that produced a report on diversity in San Francisco law firms. He chairs the board of Advancement Project and is senior counsel on Advancement's California civil rights office.

== Honors ==
Lee has written briefs in many U.S. Supreme Court cases and has presented oral arguments before seven U.S. Circuit Courts of Appeal. He has been an active member of several professional organizations, including the Los Angeles County Bar, the Ninth Circuit Judicial Conference, the Southern California Chinese Lawyer Association, and the American Bar Association.

He has received many honors for his outstanding career in civil rights law, including the Thurgood Marshall Medal of Justice (1998), the Trailblazer Award from the National Asian Pacific American Bar Association (1999), and the John Randolph Distinguished Service Award, U. S. Department of Justice (2001). He has also been awarded honorary doctorates in law from City University of New York Law School (2001), North Carolina Central University (2000), and Wesleyan University (1999).

== Personal life ==
Lee has three children and currently resides in Berkeley, California.
