= Bradford M. Freeman =

American businessman

- Born: Fargo, North Dakota
- Education: Stanford University; Harvard Business School
- Occupation: Investment banker
- Employer: Freeman Spogli & Co.

Bradford M. "Brad" Freeman is an American businessman and conservative political fundraiser.

== Career ==
Freeman was born and raised in Fargo, North Dakota, and attended Stanford University on a football scholarship. He received an MBA from Harvard Business School in 1966. Upon graduation, Freeman served six years in the National Guard and began a career as an investment banker for the firm Dean Witter Reynolds. In 1983, Freeman co-founded an investment banking firm called Riordan, Freeman & Spogli with later Los Angeles Mayor Richard Riordan and Ronald P. Spogli. The firm was renamed Freeman Spogli & Co. after Riordan's exit. By 2001, the fund controlled over $900 million in assets.

Freeman has also served as a director of Morgan Stanley DW, RDO Equipment, Koll Management Services, CBRE Group, Southern California Edison, and Edison International.

== Other activities ==
Freeman was introduced to George W. Bush in 1979, and the two quickly became good friends. Freeman served on the "Team of 100," George H. W. Bush's group of top fundraisers, and helped raise funds for George W. Bush's campaigns for Governor of Texas. Freeman served as a "Pioneer" in Bush's 2000 presidential campaign and helped raise millions of dollars for Bush and the Republican National Committee. Freeman also served as chairman of the 2000 Presidential Inaugural Committee. Though Freeman himself did not earn a major presidential appointment, Freeman's business partner, Ron Spogli, was appointed Ambassador to Italy in 2005.

In the 2016 film Meet the Donors: Does Money Talk, Freeman said that after raising and contributing millions of dollars to George W. Bush's 2000 presidential campaign, he was expecting a government appointment such as "a chance to run the CIA," but Bush instead offered him his cat. According to friends, Bush did arrange for Freeman a membership of Augusta National Golf Club.

Freeman has served on the board of trustees of Stanford University. In 2025, he donated $50 million to the Stanford football program, for which he formerly played.

== See also ==
- Ronald P. Spogli – American diplomat (born 1948)
