= Center for Law in the Public Interest =

American public interest law firm (1972–2007)

- Abbreviation: CLIPI
- Formation: 1972; 54 years ago
- Dissolved: 2007
- Type: Nonprofit public interest law firm
- Headquarters: Los Angeles, California, U.S.
- Co-directors: John R. Phillips, Carlyle W. Hall Jr.
- Key people: John R. Phillips, Carlyle W. Hall Jr.

The Center for Law in the Public Interest (CLIPI) was an American nonprofit public interest law firm based in Los Angeles, California. It was founded in 1972 by a group of young attorneys who left corporate practice to establish one of the first public interest law firms in the United States. CLIPI, like several of its contemporary public interest law firms, was initially supported by the Ford Foundation. CLIPI litigated cases in environmental law, civil rights, and transportation and housing policy.

Its attorneys helped to establish the "private attorney general" doctrine as the basis for court-awarded fees in California and had exceptional success in obtaining fees.

UCLA Library Special Collections accepted the donation of 365 boxes of CLIPI's litigation archives and records in 2026.

== History ==
CLIPI was established by Carlyle W. Hall Jr., John R. Phillips, Brent Rushforth and Frederic P. Sutherland. They were young lawyers at O'Melveny & Myers when they left to start CLIPI. Phillips and Hall served as CLIPI's co-directors for 17 years from 1972 to 1988. CLIPI was one of the first group of public interest law firms funded by the Ford Foundation.

Mary D. Nichols, later chair of the California Air Resources Board, worked as a CLIPI attorney from 1971 to 1974 and brought the first litigation under the then-recently enacted federal Clean Air Act.

From its earliest years, CLIPI undertook to utilize the "private attorney general" doctrine as the basis for court-awarded attorney's fees in its successful cases. CLIPI played a key role in drafting California's private attorney general fee award statute. By the late 1970s, CLIPI's court-awarded fees represented more than half of its budget, and, by the early 1980s, its fee awards represented by far the largest amount received by any public interest law firm. This represented a funding model for other public interest law firms.

CLIPI operated for about 35 years until it closed in 2007.

== Notable litigation ==
CLIPI attorney Carlyle W. Hall Jr. represented the Sierra Club as amici curiae in Friends of Mammoth v. Board of Supervisors (1972), in which the Supreme Court of California held that the California Environmental Quality Act's (CEQA) environmental impact report preparation requirements apply not only to public works, but also to private development requiring governmental approval. Hall and Brent Rushforth also represented the plaintiffs in the California Supreme Court's next two CEQA decisions, No Oil v. City of Los Angeles and Bozung v. Ventura County Local Agency Formation Commission. Together, these decisions established and developed a broad interpretation of CEQA, which was intended to afford the "fullest possible protection of the environment" – a principle that remains operative in California's CEQA Guidelines today.

In February 1972, one month before a scheduled groundbreaking, CLIPI filed Keith v. Volpe in federal district court on behalf of residents in the path of the proposed Century Freeway, along with the Sierra Club, the Environmental Defense Fund, and the Los Angeles chapter of the NAACP. The suit halted construction until the 1979 consent decree, later amended, provided for construction of thousands of replenishment affordable housing units, for a median transit corridor convertible to light rail – becoming the Los Angeles Metro green line – and a robust jobs and business program aimed at the impacted largely minority freeway corridor area. The firm remained counsel of record in enforcement proceedings for more than four decades.

In Blake v. City of Los Angeles (1977), CLIPI attorneys A. Thomas Hunt and Timothy B. Flynn represented a class of plaintiffs challenging gender discrimination in the hiring and promotion practices of the Los Angeles Police Department. The litigation is credited with opening the department's patrol and officer ranks to women. CLIPI maintained an employment discrimination legal program, headed first by A. Thomas Hunt and then Bill Lann Lee, against public and private employers that obtained thousands of jobs for minorities and women.

== Whistleblower legislation ==
Between 1984 and 1986, while co-director of CLIPI, John R. Phillips worked with Senator Chuck Grassley and Representative Howard Berman in support of legislation strengthening the False Claims Act's qui tam provisions, which was signed into law in October 1986. Phillips left CLIPI in 1988 and in 1993 founded a private firm representing whistleblowers.

== Fellowship program ==
CLIPI operated a Visiting Public Interest Fellowship Program, which placed recent law school graduates in public service legal work.

== Archives ==
In 2026, the UCLA Library announced that CLIPI had donated 365 boxes of its landmark legal history to UCLA Library Special Collections, amounting to 396 linear feet of legal documents and case files. The donation was commemorated at an October 2025 event co-hosted by Carlyle W. Hall Jr., Brenda Jackson Drake, and Michael V. Drake, president emeritus of the University of California.

== Notable people ==
- Mary D. Nichols
- John R. Phillips
- Geoffrey Cowan
- Bill Lann Lee
- Ann E. Carlson
- Stephen M. Cutler
- David Huebner
- Evan H. Caminker

== See also ==
- Natural Resources Defense Council
- Environmental Defense Fund
- Earthjustice
- NAACP Legal Defense and Educational Fund
