= John R. Phillips (attorney) =

American diplomat and attorney

John R Phillips
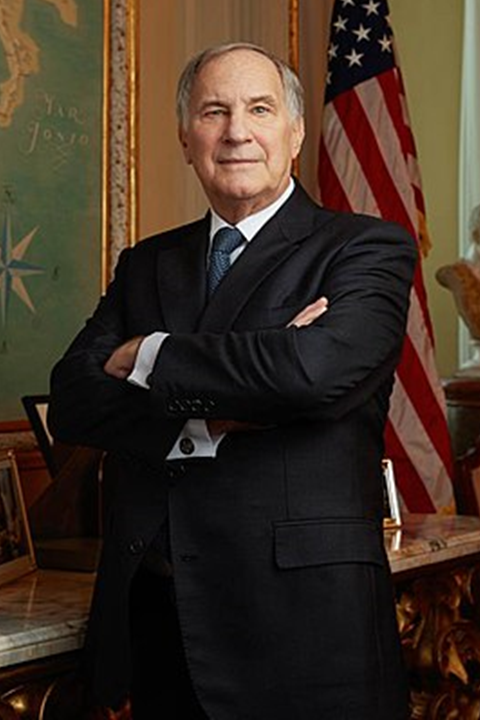

United States Ambassador to Italy United States Ambassador to San Marino
- In office September 13, 2013 – January 20, 2017
- President: Barack Obama
- Preceded by: David Thorne
- Succeeded by: Lewis M. Eisenberg

Personal details
- Born: December 15, 1942 (age 83) Leechburg, Pennsylvania, U.S.
- Spouse: Linda Douglass
- Children: 1
- Education: University of Notre Dame (BA); University of California, Berkeley (JD)

John R. Phillips (born December 15, 1942) is an American diplomat and attorney who served as the United States Ambassador to Italy and San Marino, serving from 2013 to 2017. As a partner at Phillips & Cohen, LLP (1988–2013) and before that, in Los Angeles, he practiced public interest law, specializing in whistleblower cases that recovered billions from companies defrauding the government.

== Early life and education ==
Phillips was born and grew up in Leechburg, Pennsylvania, a small steel mill town in western Pennsylvania. His grandparents emigrated from Italy in the early 1900s. Their family name was anglicized and changed from "Filippi" to "Phillips."

Phillips received a B.A. degree from the University of Notre Dame in 1966 and a J.D. degree in 1969 from the University of California at Berkeley School of Law (Boalt Hall), where he was a member of the editorial board of the California Law Review.

== Professional career ==
Phillips joined the Los Angeles, California, law firm of O'Melveny & Myers as an associate in 1969. After two years, he left to start one of the first Ford Foundation-funded public interest law firms, the Center for Law in the Public Interest (CLIPI), in Los Angeles with three former colleagues.

== Center for Law in the Public Interest ==
Phillips was co-director of Center for Law in the Public Interest (CLIPI) for 17 years. During that time, the firm was a major force litigating landmark environmental, civil rights, consumer protection and corporate fraud and accountability cases. Some of its court cases include the following:

- Won consumer class actions suit against Toyota Motors resulting in a recall and repair of a brake problem in Toyota's first Camry model and consumer class action against Sprint for overcharging its customers.

== Whistleblower work ==
Phillips played a significant role in the creation of the US government's whistleblower reward program designed to encourage private citizens to expose and stop fraud against the government. He worked closely with Sen. Charles Grassley (R-Iowa) and then-Rep. Howard Berman (D-CA) to secure congressional passage of the amended False Claims Act with "qui tam" (whistleblower) provisions which were signed into law by President Reagan in October 1986. The law has become the government's primary tool in holding accountable corporations that have defrauded the U.S. government.

Phillips started a private law practice, Phillips & Cohen LLP, in Los Angeles and later moved it to Washington, DC, and opened an office in San Francisco.

Shortly after passage of the amended False Claims Act, Phillips founded in 1986 Taxpayers Against Fraud, a non-profit group that is dedicated to educating the public about government whistleblower programs and advancing public and government support for whistleblower cases.

== Public appointments ==
John Phillips was selected by President Bill Clinton to be a member of the President's Commission on White House Fellowships. He served from 1997 to 2001. In 2009, President Obama appointed Phillips to be the chairman of the President's Commission on White House Fellowships, where he served for four years. He was an appointed member (1988) to serve on the 9th Circuit Judicial Conference.

President Obama appointed him as US Ambassador to Italy and San Marino in 2013.

== Italy ==
Phillips invested in a group of houses (a "borgo," or village) in Tuscany in 2001 that were more than 800 years old and were in a ruined state. He spent eight years restoring and improving the buildings and grounds, following strict historic preservation rules. The Borgo Finocchieto, which has a total of 22 bedrooms (Borgo Finocchieto in Bibbiano, Buonconvento), is designed to host groups, small conferences and educational programs, loosely based on the Aspen Institute model.

Phillips was a member of the Board of Trustees of the American Academy in Rome from 2009 to 2013. He rejoined the board in March 2017 after he stepped down as ambassador. Before he became ambassador to Italy, he made more than 50 trips to Italy in the previous decade and has made approximately 100 separate trips to Italy in his lifetime.

== Awards and recognition ==
- "Litigators Hall of Fame," Lawdragon
- Taxpayers Against Fraud Lifetime Achievement Award
- ACLU of Southern California Lifetime Achievement Award

== Personal ==
Phillips is married to Linda Douglass, a veteran journalist and communications strategist. They have a daughter.

Diplomatic posts
Preceded by David Thorne	United States Ambassador to Italy; 2013–2017	Succeeded by Lewis M. Eisenberg
Preceded by David Thorne	United States Ambassador to San Marino; 2013–2017	Succeeded by Lewis M. Eisenberg
