= Freeman Spogli & Co. =

Private equity firm

- Type: Private
- Industry: Private Equity
- Founded: 1983; 43 years ago
- Founder: Richard Riordan, Bradford M. Freeman and Ronald P. Spogli
- Headquarters: Los Angeles, California, United States
- Products: Private equity funds, Leveraged buyouts
- Website: www.freemanspogli.com

Freeman Spogli & Co. is an American private equity firm dedicated to investing with management in middle market companies in the consumer and distribution sectors through leveraged buyouts and recapitalizations. The firm is a private enterprise and primarily invests in its domestic American market.

== History ==
Freeman Spogli, originally known as Riordan, Freeman & Spogli, was founded in 1983 by Richard Riordan, Bradford M. Freeman, and Ronald P. Spogli.

Co-founder Richard Riordan, who would later go on to serve as Mayor of Los Angeles, had been an attorney and had made substantial personal investments in technology companies. After joining the firm, Riordan focused primarily on venture capital investments in computer, medical, and semiconductor companies. Prior to co-founding Freeman Spogli, Bradford Freeman and Ronald P. Spogli had been managing directors in the Corporate Finance Department at Dean Witter Reynolds.

The firm made its name in the 1980s through a series of leveraged buyout transactions. Throughout the 1980s, Riordan, Freeman & Spogli also executed leveraged buyouts of several supermarket retailers including Bayless Southwest (Phoenix), Boys Markets (Los Angeles), P&C Foods (Syracuse, NY), Piggly Wiggly (various Southern states), and Tops Markets (New York and Pennsylvania).

Riordan separated from the other two partners in 1988 when they decided to specialize in larger leveraged buyouts of more established companies. Riordan relinquished his general partner position in the firm to form a venture capital firm called Riordan, Lewis & Haden with J. Christopher Lewis and former Los Angeles Rams quarterback Pat Haden. Following Riordan's departure, the firm was renamed Freeman Spogli & Co.

== Investments ==
Among the firm's historical investments are the following:

- A.J. Bayless Markets
- Advance Auto Parts
- Batteries Plus Bulbs
- Boot Barn
- CB Richard Ellis
- El Pollo Loco
- First Watch
- HHGregg
- Micro Warehouse
- NEW Asurion
- The Paradies Shops
- P&C Foods
- PETCO
- Philz Coffee
- Piggly Wiggly
- Savers
- Smile Brands
- Sur La Table
- Tops Markets
- Winebow

== See also ==
- Freeman Spogli Institute for International Studies
