= James C. Robinson (health economist) =

American health economics

James Claude Robinson is a professor of health economics at the University of California, Berkeley School of Public Health, where he has the title of the Leonard D. Schaeffer Endowed Chair in Health Economics and Policy. Robinson is also the Chair of the Berkeley Center for Health Technology, which supports research and professional education projects related to coverage, management, and payment methods for innovative technologies including biopharmaceuticals, medical devices, and diagnostics.

Robinson's professional activities include his roles as Senior Director for Medical Technology at the Integrated Healthcare Association, Contributing Editor for Health Affairs journal, and as keynote speaker for conferences, policy roundtables, and board meetings. At Berkeley, Professor Robinson teaches health policy and economics, focusing on the biotechnology, medical device, insurance, physician, and hospital sectors. He has published three books and over 120 papers in scientific and policy journals such as the New England Journal of Medicine, JAMA, and Health Affairs.

Work regarding the Future of Commercial Insurance Profitability

Robinson's 2006 article, “The Commercial Health Insurance Industry In An Era Of Eroding Employer Coverage”, discussed employment based coverage, once a mainstay of attracting employees, has declined. From a peak of covering approximately 164 million people in 2000, employers by 2004 covered approximately 159 million people. The insurance companies that employers utilized for health coverage felt the impact of the changing employer environment. Insurance companies, to maintain their profitability, turned to diversification of coverage, servicing private and public programs.

Can insurance companies maintain profitability in the years to come? Insurance companies still rely on the employer based book of business which is in constant flux with the implementation of the Affordable Care Act, some insurance companies need to reduce premiums due to regulatory pressures on excess revenue, the market place itself is changing from insured to self-insured, from comprehensive to high-deductible plan design.

Insurance Industry profits have increased due to the result of increasing privatization of Medicaid and Medicare programs. A 2012 Bloomberg Government Study examined the financial performance of the five largest publicly traded health insurers by market capitalization. Quarterly revenue for Medicare business, of the insurers who reported, increased by almost one-third, from $12.55 billion to $16.39 billion with Medicaid revenue doubling from $2 billion to $4.11 billion in a period from fourth quarter 2008 through third quarter 2011. Government business now accounts for more than 40 percent with commercial business accounting for less than half of the total revenue.

Drivers of change continue to include the changing role of employers and health coverage, where defined contribution is replacing traditional insurance benefits; increase enrollment in government sponsored health plans, where increases in Medicare Advantage plans and Part D Drug Discount Program enrollments are growing; implementation of the Affordable Care Act (ACA), where 27 million additional people will be insured, and consolidation. In 2011, there were 20 mergers and acquisitions within the managed care, totaling almost $8 billion, and after enactment of the ACA more consolidation took place than in each of the three previous years. Ultimately it will depend on whether the insurance industry can fulfill its value proposition of managing health costs without compromising safety and outcomes.

Has privatization of the public health plans ensured success from a cost standpoint? A study conducted in 2013 examined payments to private plans from the time of 1985 to 2013 and found that Medicare had overpaid private insurers by $282.6 billion, with an overpayment of $34.1 billion in 2012 alone. Private insurers utilize four strategies in dealing with Medicare beneficiaries: 1) cherry-picking healthier beneficiaries, through advertising, office location as examples, who cost less. Although all seniors who choose to enroll are accepted private plans induce sicker beneficiaries to disenroll by making expensive care inconvenient; 2) recruiting mild to sometimes serious beneficiaries which trigger higher premiums but don't have expensive care; 3) enroll patients who receive majority of their care free through the Veterans Administration; and 4) lobby Congress to raise reimbursement.

Work Regarding the Evolution of the Insurance Industry from Private to Public Coverage

In his 2006 article, “The Commercial Health Insurance Industry In An Era Of Eroding Employer Coverage”, Robinson discussed the dynamics of the insurance industry transforming from a largely private only venture to one that has a great deal of Publicly funded health care. Robinson argues that the majority of health insurance in the U.S. is now provided by large firms that cover individuals with private and publicly funded plans. Traditionally, health insurance was provided by an employer as a benefit to their employees. This system provided the majority of health insurance for the majority of the 20th century and peaked in the year 2000 with 164.4 million being covered by employer based plans. However, this figure then dropped by nearly 5 million in the next four years. The reduction in employer based coverage caused the insurance industry to adjust in order to stay profitable. Many smaller or less profitable firms merged with larger, more profitable firms to be able to offset some of the losses from employer based plans. The other major change has been the commercial sector embracing and moving into Medicaid and Medicare coverage to stay viable.

This expansion into public programs has allowed the private insurance industry to grow despite the erosion of employment based coverage. Part of this success is due to state level budgetary constraints that have made them willing to transfer Financial risk and outsource the management requirements to a commercial carrier. This relationship will ensure that the profitability of the commercial health insurance industry will be linked to the budgetary cycles and political fluctuations of state and federal governments. However, these budgetary pressures are not expected to affect Medicare for another half decade.

Work Regarding the Recent Trends in Commercial Health Insurance

One of Robinson's research areas is related to the economics of health insurance. In the United States, the term health insurance is used to describe any program that helps patients pay for medical expenses. However, in contrast to other countries around the world, health insurance in the United States is available through multiple different programs including but not limited to privately purchased insurance, social insurance (Medicare) or a social welfare program (Medicaid) funded in joint by the state and federal government. The majority of Americans have private health insurance with a very large proportion of the private health insurance offered as part of an employee compensation packaged administered through the workplace. For example, in 2009, 169.7 million (87%) of the 194.5 million people with private coverage were getting their coverage from their employers.

In a 2006 article published in Health Affairs, Robinson describes the landscape of the commercial insurance market and some of its potential barriers to growth and sustainability due to increasing external pressure. Some of these barriers to growth include its high dependency on employer-based insurance, inability to use pricing power due to cash rich non-profit Blues plans and the market trend towards consumer driven health benefit designs (also known as high deductible health plans) which transfer risk and reward between the consumer and the plan. What is equally concerning is that during the years 2001 through 2010, the rate of employment-based insurance coverage decreased due to rising health care costs placed on plans and employers. With an inability to strengthen their foothold in the now-decreasing employer based market, Robinson suggests that the commercial insurances’ will use historical trends, perspective and economic principles of healthcare finance to overcome these challenges and sustain their growth in earnings. He also predicts the future earnings and profitability of the commercial health insurance industry to be dependent on their ability to anticipate and work through the political agenda and fiscal policies at both the state and federal levels.

Under the provisions of the Affordable Care Act(ACA) the commercial health insurance industry has been granted important opportunities through the privately managed healthcare insurance exchanges and the expansion of the Medicaid program in many states. There is also a growing desire of the public purchaser of health to outsource the difficult task of managing increasingly complicated patient care to the private sector which may be more efficient due to greater competitive pressures. However, the fate of the employer-based coverage market due to provisions in the ACA remains unclear. Recent evidence suggests that the erosion of the employer-based health insurance may not continue as employers may be more incentivized to continue healthcare; the cost of coverage was $8,483 versus the actual cost of dropping active employee health benefits at $17,269. While additional year-end evidence is needed, the ACA does appear to increase the opportunities of expanded growth for the private sector in the individual, Medicaid, and Medicare markets.

== Bibliography ==
- James C. Robinson (2015). Purchasing Medical Innovation: The Right Technology, for the Right Patient, at the Right Price. Univ of California Press. ISBN 978-0-520-28166-0.
- James C. Robinson (1999). The Corporate Practice of Medicine: Competition and Innovation in Health Care. University of California Press. ISBN 978-0-520-92376-8.
- James C. Robinson (2000). "Deregulation and Regulatory Backlash in Health Care" (PDF). California Management Review. 43 (1): 13–33. doi:10.2307/41166063. JSTOR 41166063. S2CID 155415674.
- James C. Robinson; Diane R. Rittenhouse (2006). "Improving Quality in Medicaid: The Use of Care Management Processes for Chronic Illness and Preventive Care" (PDF). Medical Care. 44 (1): 47–54. doi:10.1097/01.mlr.0000188992.48592.cd. JSTOR 3768250. PMID 16365612. S2CID 16935519.
