= Lewis Eisenberg =

American financier, investor & diplomat (born 1942)

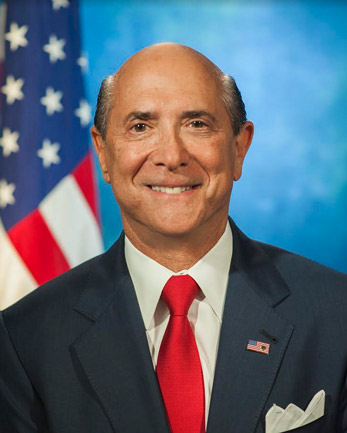

United States Ambassador to Italy United States Ambassador to San Marino
- In office October 4, 2017 – January 4, 2021
- President: Donald Trump
- Preceded by: John R. Phillips
- Succeeded by: Jack Markell

Chair of the Port Authority of New York and New Jersey
- In office November 9, 1995 – December 13, 2001
- Preceded by: Kathleen Donovan
- Succeeded by: Jack Sinagra

Personal details
- Born: Lewis Michael Eisenberg; October 12, 1942 (age 84) Illinois, U.S.
- Party: Republican
- Education: Dartmouth College (BA); Cornell University (MBA)

Lewis Michael Eisenberg (born October 12, 1942) is an American financier and investor who was the United States Ambassador to Italy and the United States Ambassador to San Marino. He is known for co-founding and heading private equity firm Granite Capital International Group L.P. He has a multi-decade history in American political fundraising circles and has held a number of national, state, and bi-state appointments throughout his career, including serving as the chairman of the Port Authority of New York and New Jersey at the time of the September 11, 2001 attack of the World Trade Center, which the Port Authority operated.

In July 2017, Eisenberg was named as President Donald Trump's nominee to become the United States Ambassador to Italy. He was confirmed by the U.S. Senate on August 3, 2017.

== Early life ==
Eisenberg was born to a Jewish family in Illinois and grew up in Chicago. His family made their living in the agricultural business. He attended Dartmouth College, earning a bachelor's degree in 1964. He enrolled at Cornell University, where he earned an MBA in 1966.

== Financial career ==
Eisenberg began his career on Wall Street after completing his education at Cornell University. He began working for Goldman Sachs in 1966. From 1966 to 1989, Eisenberg worked in a variety of capacities for Goldman Sachs. Eisenberg became a partner in 1978 and concluded his run at Goldman Sachs as co-head of the Equity Division.

In 1990, Eisenberg co-founded Granite Capital International Group L.P., an investment management firm where, as co-chairman, he oversaw investment management for private clients. He co-founded Granum Communications and served on that company's board until 2007. He served on the board of ITC, the nation's largest independent electric transmission business and a former KKR portfolio company.

Eisenberg served as a senior advisor for Kohlberg Kravis Roberts beginning in 2009. Working alongside co-founders Henry Kravis and George R. Roberts, Eisenberg provided enhanced investment expertise particularly in the public infrastructure arena.

== Public service ==
Eisenberg was appointed by New Jersey Governor Christine Todd Whitman to chair the New Jersey Commission on Privatization and Competitive Contracting in 1994. He was elected chairman of the board of Commissioners of the Port Authority of New York and New Jersey on November 9, 1995. Prior to his election as chairman, Eisenberg had served since February 1994 as a commissioner on the same agency's board, having been nominated by Governor Christine Todd Whitman. During his term as chairman, his most notable achievement was the negotiation of a long-term lease with Larry Silverstein for the World Trade Center; the Towers were at their highest occupancy in history in the late 1990s and the desire to privatize the buildings was born from an economic strategy of the Pataki administration.

His term as chairman of the Port Authority ended in December 2001. It was during his time as chairman that the September 11, 2001 terrorist attacks occurred at the Twin Towers, taking the lives of 84 Port Authority employees including then executive director Neil Levin.

Prior to the 9/11 terrorist attacks, Eisenberg was scheduled to step down as chairman of the Port Authority in preparation for a proposed appointment by then Acting New Jersey Governor Donald DiFrancesco to the chairmanship of the New Jersey Sports and Exposition Authority.

Eisenberg chose to stay on at the Port Authority through the days after the 9/11 attack and to provide "continued leadership" in order "to provide a comforting continuity in times of tragedy". Soon after stepping down from the Port Authority, New York Governor George Pataki appointed Eisenberg as a director of the Lower Manhattan Development Corporation's board in January 2002, where he remained involved with the aftermath of the attacks and contributed to the rebuilding of Lower Manhattan. At that time he was appointed by Pataki to chair the Victims' Families and Transportation Advisory Council until April 2003.

== Politics ==
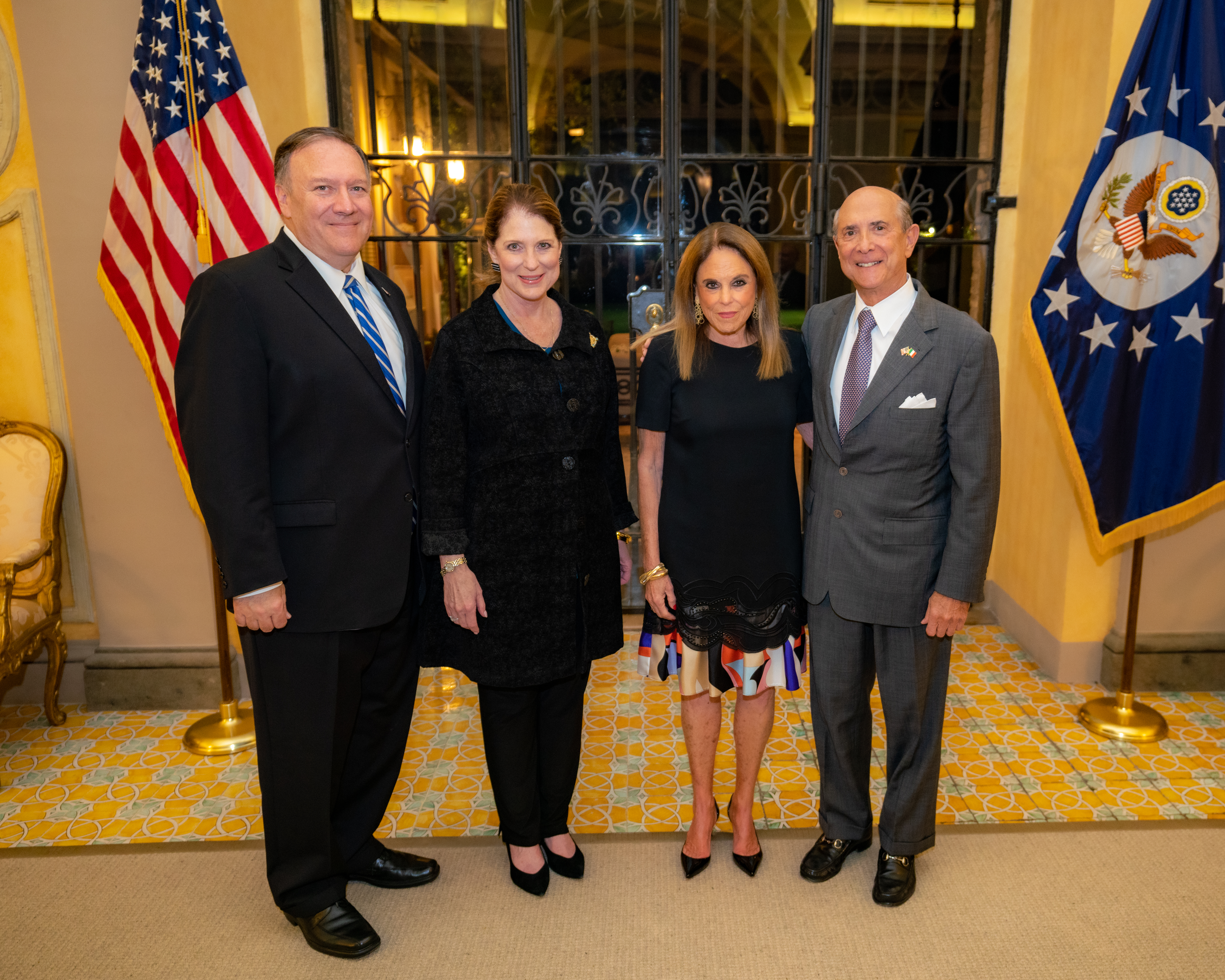
Eisenberg (right) with US Secretary of State Mike Pompeo in 2019

In 2000, Eisenberg served as the chairman of the Victory 2000 campaign in New Jersey. In January 2002, Eisenberg became the chairman of finance committee for the Republican National Committee in Washington, D.C. In 2003, he became co-chairman of the NYC 2004 Host Committee for the Republican Convention and co-chairman of Bush/Cheney 2004 in New Jersey. Eisenberg served on the transition teams of Governors Whitman from New Jersey and Governor Pataki from New York and on the Bush-Cheney presidential transition team. He is a founder and former chairman of the Republican Leadership Council, a political action committee based in Washington, D.C. From 2002 to 2004, he served as chairman for the finance committee of the Republican National Committee. In 2004, he served as co-chairman of the Convention Host Committee for the 2004 Republican National Convention. In 2008, he served as John McCain for President National Co-chairman, and as National Finance chairman for McCain/Palin Victory 2008. He was a fundraising leader for the presidential campaign of Donald Trump in 2016. He is a resident of Rumson, New Jersey.

== Awards and recognition ==
In 1995, he received the Eagle Award from the New Jersey Alliance for Action. In 2000, Eisenberg was honored as the "Man of the Year" by the National Conference for Community and Justice in New Jersey. In 2000, Monmouth University named him as the New Jersey Businessman of the Year.

On May 16, 2001, Eisenberg received an Honorary Doctor of Laws Degree from Monmouth University in Monmouth, New Jersey. On May 5, 2002, he was awarded an Honorary Doctor of Humane Letters Degree from the Rabbinical College of America.

On 2018 Eisenberg received the Premio Simpatia in Rome.

== Non-profit work ==
Eisenberg served on the advisory council of Samuel Johnson Graduate School of Management at Cornell University, and was a board member of St. Barnabas Health Care System and past chairman of its investment committee. He served on the board of trustees of Monmouth Medical Center Foundation.

Diplomatic posts
Preceded by John R. Phillips	United States Ambassador to Italy; 2017–2021	Succeeded by Jack Markell
Preceded by John R. Phillips	United States Ambassador to San Marino; 2017–2021	Succeeded by Jack Markell
