= Premio Simpatia =

The Premio Simpatia (Sympathy Prize) is an annual Italian prize. It has granted since 1971 to those who have distinguished themselves in the social sector, regardless of their sectors of activity.

The awards ceremony takes place at the Capitoline Palace of Rome, which is the reason why the award is also known as Oscar Capitolino.

Among the most renowned winners is the President of the Italian Republic, Sandro Pertini, in 1985.

== History ==
The prize was designed by Domenico Pertica, but finds its historical origins in Aldo Palazzeschi and Vittorio De Sica. The ceremony is organized by the Comitato Romano Incremento Attività Cittadine (literally: Roman Committee of complementary urban activities). The Oscar Capitolino is symbolized by a bronze rose created by the sculptor Assen Peikov.

In 2001, an Oscar of the Capitol was awarded to the memory of Domenico Pertica, its founder.

== Winners ==
The list below is not exhaustive:

- 1971: Aldo Palazzeschi, Enrico Montesano and Mita Medici
- 1972: Alberto Bevilacqua and Federico Fellini
- 1973: Giulio Andreotti
- 1974: Fausto Papetti and Franco Zeffirelli
- 1975: Isabella Biagini
- 1976: Anthony Quinn
- 1977: Alberto Sordi and Nicoletta Orsomando
- 1978: Monica Vitti and Paolo Rossi
- 1979: Dario Bellezza
- 1980: Pino Calvi
- 1981: Leonardo Sciascia
- 1986: Elsa Morante (in memoriam)
- 1991: Laura Biagiotti
- 1997: Igor Man
- 1999: Achille Silvestrini
- 2000: Piccola Orchestra Avion Travel
- 2004: Umberto Guidoni
- 2006: Fiorella Mannoia
- 2007: Raffaella Carrà and Ezio Mauro
- 2010: Ornella Vanoni, Carlo Vanzina and Carlo Verdone
- 2011: Achille Bonito Oliva and Nancy Brilli
- 2018: Paola Turci and Lewis Eisenberg
