= The Letters Page =

- Directed by: Steno
- Written by: Sandro Continenza; Lucio Fulci; Steno
- Starring: Franca Valeri; Alberto Sordi; Peppino De Filippo
- Cinematography: Tonino Delli Colli
- Edited by: Giuliana Attenni
- Music by: Raffaele Gervasio
- Release date: 1955
- Running time: 95 minutes
- Country: Italy
- Language: Italian

The Letters Page (Italian: Piccola posta) is a 1955 Italian comedy film directed by Steno, starring Alberto Sordi. Actually the film's full title is Piccola posta ovvero: cercasi vecchia con dote (translation: "The Letters Page, or Searching for a Rich Older Woman"). Co-writer Lucio Fulci has a cameo appearance in the film (young man with glasses). Cameraman Delli Colli's wife (Alexandra) years later wound up co-starring in one of Fulci's later slasher films, The New York Ripper (1982).

Piccola Posta is a sequel of sorts to Steno's earlier film A Day in Court, similarly formatted into a series of short vignettes, each involving different characters, and the stories are all tied together through Lady Eva and her "Dear Abby"-style column. Steno said in interviews that he liked Sordi and allowed him to adlib some of the scenes, Sordi basing his material on past experiences he claimed to have had with older women.

== Plot ==
Alberto Sordi plays Rodolfo Vanzino, a phony nobleman / con man who runs a nursing home in which he preys upon the aged old ladies in his care, hoping to get their insurance money when they die. Franca Valeri plays Lady Eva, who poses as a wealthy Polish woman of noble birth, who writes a popular "Advice to the Lovelorn" column in a newspaper. Although Eva is well intentioned, her advice gets some of her readers in a bind, such as Donna Virginia, a very rich old woman who enters Vanzino's nursing home as an inmate on Eva's advice. But although she freely dispenses romantic advice to her readers, Eva's own love life suffers as she is hopelessly in love with a veterinarian who ignores her advances. She then opens a dog salon in the hopes of attracting her true love's attention, but the dogs escape and cause a disturbance in the town. The finale has a number of the characters all meeting up again at the local police station for various reasons.

== Cast ==
- Franca Valeri as Lady Eva
- Alberto Sordi as Rodolfo Vanzino
- Peppino De Filippo as Gigliozzi
- Memmo Carotenuto as Ranuccio
- Anna Maria Pancani as Franchina
- Nanda Primavera as Lady Eva's Mother
- Sergio Raimondi as Marco Cappelli (the veterinarian)
- Amalia Pellegrini as Donna Virginia
- Nietta Zocchi as Gigliozzi's Wife
- Nicoletta Orsomando as Herself
- Vincenzo Talarico as the Publisher
- Salvo Libassi as Engr. Tamburella
- Arnoldo Foà as Narrator
