= Nicoletta Orsomando =

Italian actress and television personality (1929–2021)

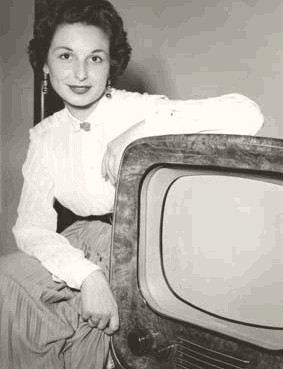
- Orsomando in the mid-1950s
- Born: Nicolina Orsomando; 11 January 1929; Casapulla, Italy
- Died: 21 August 2021 (aged 92); Rome, Italy
- Occupations: Continuity announcer; actress
- Spouse: Roberto Rollino (m. 1957; div. 1972)
- Children: Federica Rollino

Nicoletta Orsomando (born Nicolina Orsomando; 11 January 1929 – 21 August 2021) was an Italian television personality. She was the first Italian continuity announcer to appear on television, on 22 October 1953, and is considered the "dean" of Italian continuity announcers.

== Biography ==
Born in 1929 in Casapulla, at that time in the province of Naples, she moved while still a baby with her family to Mazzarino, and later to Lavello. They then moved to Littoria (currently Latina) and finally to Rome.

She appeared for the first time on 22 October 1953 on Italian television at a time when television in Italy was still experimental, as the first announcer. She presented a program for children, a documentary about the Encyclopædia Britannica.

In 2010, she participated in the variety show on Rai 1 Insegnami a sognare, presented by Pino Insegno. At the beginning of 2011, she appeared on the program Domenica in in the section In onda, hosted by Lorella Cuccarini.

Later, she had a column in the monthly magazine 50 & Più in which she answered reader letters.

Orsomando died at a hospital in Rome on 21 August 2021, at the age of 92.

== Filmography ==
- Piccola posta (1955), directed by Steno – herself
- Totò lascia o raddoppia? (1956), directed by Camillo Mastrocinque – herself
- Parenti serpenti (1992), directed by Mario Monicelli – herself

== Television (selection) ==
- Announcer and speaker at Rai 1 between 1953 and 1993
- L'amico degli animali (1956)
- Un disco per l'estate 1966 (1966)
- Ischia International Journalism Award (1981–1982)
- Omaggio a Venezia (1984)

== Honours ==
- Oscar Capitolino (Rome, 1977)
- Commander of the Order of Merit of the Italian Republic (Rome, 1994)
