= List of ambassadors of the United States to San Marino =

Ambassador of the United States to San Marino
- Ambasciatore degli Stati Uniti d'America in San Marino
- Seal of the United States Department of State

- Flag of a United States ambassador

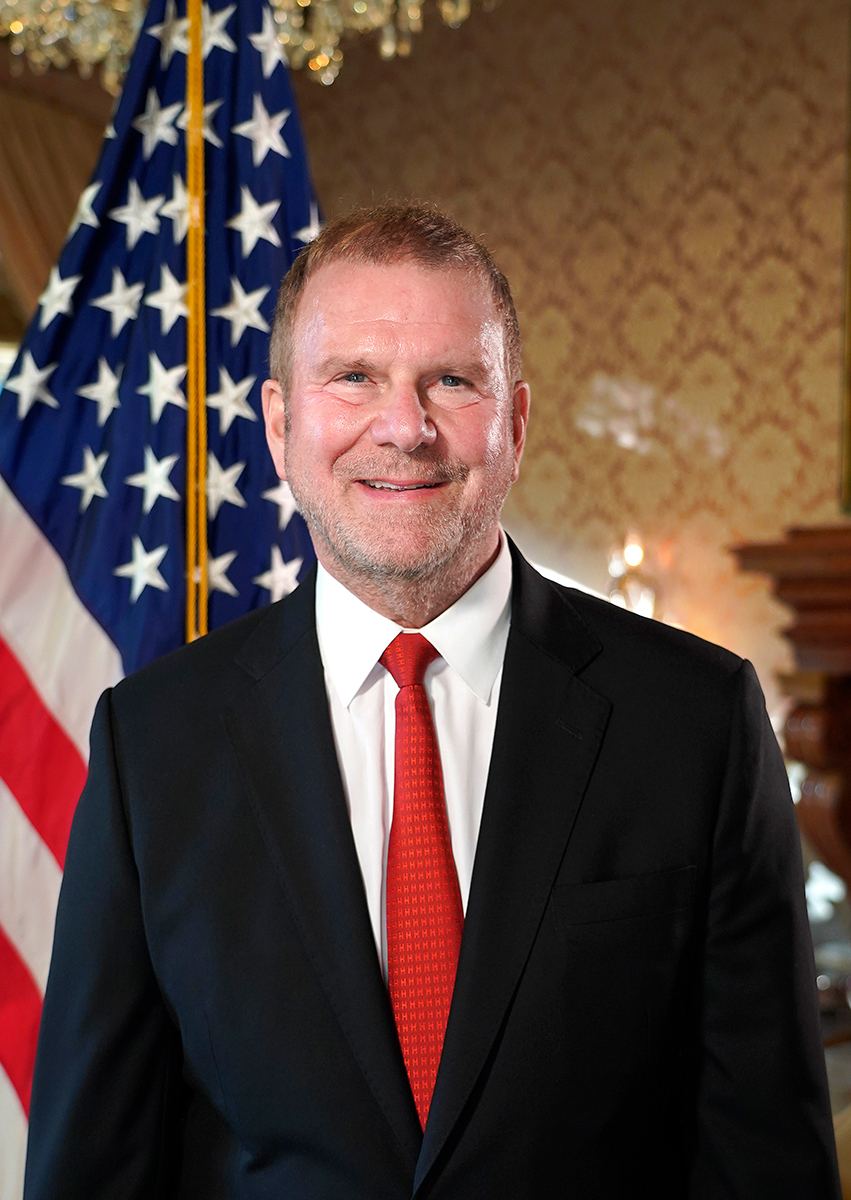
- Incumbent; Tilman Fertitta since May 6, 2025
- Nominator: The president of the United States
- Inaugural holder: Ronald P. Spogli as Ambassador Extraordinary and Plenipotentiary
- Formation: November 22, 2006
- Website: United States Virtual Presence Post Republic of San Marino

The United States ambassador to San Marino is the official representative of the government of the United States to the government of San Marino. The ambassador is concurrently the ambassador to Italy, while resident in Rome, Italy.

== Ambassadors ==
Name	Title	Appointed	Presented credentials	Terminated mission	Notes
Ronald P. Spogli – Political appointee	Ambassador Extraordinary and Plenipotentiary	November 22, 2006	March 8, 2007	February 6, 2009	
David Thorne – Political appointee	Ambassador Extraordinary and Plenipotentiary	August 17, 2009	September 4, 2009	July 30, 2013	
John R. Phillips – Political appointee	Ambassador Extraordinary and Plenipotentiary	August 16, 2013	September 13, 2013	January 18, 2017	
Lewis Eisenberg – Political appointee	Ambassador Extraordinary and Plenipotentiary	August 3, 2017	October 4, 2017	January 4, 2021	
Jack Markell – Political appointee	Ambassador Extraordinary and Plenipotentiary	July 27, 2023	September 23, 2023	January 11, 2025	
Tilman Fertitta – Political appointee	Ambassador Extraordinary and Plenipotentiary	April 29, 2025	May 6, 2025	Incumbent	

== See also ==
- San Marino – United States relations
- Foreign relations of San Marino
- Ambassadors of the United States
