= Ronald P. Spogli =

American diplomat (born 1948)

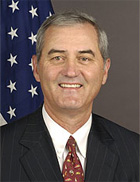

United States Ambassador to Italy
- In office August 10, 2005 – February 6, 2009
- President: George W. Bush; Barack Obama
- Preceded by: Mel Sembler
- Succeeded by: David Thorne

United States Ambassador to San Marino
- In office March 8, 2007 – February 6, 2009
- President: George W. Bush; Barack Obama
- Preceded by: Office established
- Succeeded by: David Thorne

Personal details
- Born: 1948 (age 77–78) Los Angeles, California, United States
- Party: Republican
- Profession: Diplomat

Ronald P. Spogli (born 1948) is an American venture capitalist and politician. He is the former United States Ambassador to Italy and to San Marino. He was confirmed by the U.S. Senate on June 30, 2005, after being nominated by President George W. Bush on June 9. He was preceded by Mel Sembler as ambassador to Italy and is the first American ambassador to San Marino from the United States. This new position was created as a result of the excellent relations between the two countries.

== Early life ==
In 1948, Spogli was born in Los Angeles, California.

== Education ==
Spogli received an A.B. in history from Stanford University in 1970, and was elected to Phi Beta Kappa in his junior year. He earned an M.B.A. in 1975 from Harvard Business School, where he was future president George W. Bush's roommate. He lived abroad in Florence and Milan for two years during his time at Stanford, and became fluent in the Italian language.

== Career ==
Spogli is a co-founder of Freeman Spogli & Co., a private equity investment firm. Before that he was a managing director in the Investment Banking Division of Dean Witter Reynolds. In 2002, President Bush appointed Spogli to a three-year term with the J. William Fulbright Foreign Scholarship board. Spogli quit working at Freeman Spogli & Co. on July 31, 2005, and was sworn in as the U.S. Ambassador to Italy on August 10, 2005, and to San Marino in September 2006. He left post on February 6, 2009. He received the America Award of the Italy-USA Foundation in 2016.

== See also ==
- Bradford M. Freeman

Diplomatic posts
Preceded by Mel Sembler	United States Ambassador to Italy; 2005–2009	Succeeded by David H. Thorne
New title	United States Ambassador to San Marino; 2006–2009	Succeeded by David H. Thorne
