= Health Affairs =

- Discipline: Medicine, health care
- Language: English

Publication details
- History: 1981–present
- Publisher: Project HOPE (United States)
- Impact factor: 8.1 (2024)

Standard abbreviations
- ISO 4: Health Aff. (Millwood)

Indexing
- ISSN: 0278-2715 (print); 1544-5208 (web)
- LCCN: 82643664
- OCLC no.: 07760874

Links
- Journal homepage; Topics homepage; Forefront homepage

Health Affairs is a monthly, peer-reviewed health and health care policy journal published by Project HOPE. The journal, which maintains editorial independence from Project HOPE, publishes research, reviews, commentary, and analysis, as well as journalistic content and personal stories. Several issues each year are devoted to specific themes.

The journal was established in 1981 as a quarterly by its founding editor, John K. Iglehart, who served as editor until 2007 (then again on an interim basis from 2013 to 2014). Donald E. Metz was appointed interim editor-in-chief in 2025 after Alan R. Weil departed in 2024. Other past editors include James C. Robinson and Susan Dentzer.

The journal’s current impact factor (2024) is 8.1.

Through its publications and other activities, Health Affairs explores health policy issues of current concern in both domestic and international spheres. Its mission is to serve as a high-level, nonpartisan forum to promote analysis and discussion on improving health and health care, addressing such issues as cost, quality, access, and nonmedical determinants of health. Iglehart described the journal's aim as "provoking a constructive domestic U.S. dialogue between the warring political parties and countless private stakeholders."

The journal’s audience includes government and health industry leaders; health care advocates; scholars of health, health care, and health policy; and others concerned with health and health care issues in the United States and worldwide.

The journal has been described in The Washington Post as "the bible of health policy" and a "must-read for anyone with a serious interest in medicine, health care and health care policy." Health Affairs’ articles are regularly covered in major news media and read and cited by leaders around the globe, including members of Congress, ministry of health officials, and members of the judicial branch.

== Other types of content ==
Since its founding, Health Affairs has added a variety of content types and platforms in addition to the monthly journal.

=== Journal ===
Health Affairs, the flagship journal, is a subscription-based product that is published monthly.

=== Health Affairs Scholar ===
Launched in 2023, Health Affairs Scholar is an open access journal that publishes peer-reviewed research focused on emerging and global health policy issues. The editor-in-chief is Kathryn A. Phillips, PhD., Professor of Health Economics and Health Services Research at the University of California, San Francisco. Health Affairs Scholar is published in partnership with Oxford University Press. It is indexed in the Web of Science, PubMed Central, and Google Scholar. Its current impact factor (2024) is 2.7.

=== Health Affairs Forefront ===
Forefront was established in 2006 as Health Affairs Blog, then renamed Forefront in 2021. It is a free access, daily, digital-only publication that provides readers with analysis, commentary, and proposals on current and enduring health policy issues. Forefront features work from researchers, clinicians, health policy experts, policy makers, and industry leaders. For timeliness, Forefront is not peer-reviewed. Forefront articles have been cited by members of Congress and major news outlets.

=== Narrative Matters ===
Narrative Matters is a personal-essay section of Health Affairs journal. It was established in 1999 with Fitzhugh Mullan (George Washington University) as its original editor.

During its history, Narrative Matters has published nearly 350 policy narratives and poems on a wide range of topics by well-known writers including Julia Alvarez, Siddhartha Mukherjee, Alexander McCall Smith, and Abraham Verghese; by distinguished medical professionals and academics; and by patients and their families. In 2006, the Johns Hopkins University Press published a selection of essays from Narrative Matters: Narrative Matters: The Power of the Personal Essay in Health Policy (editors: Fitzhugh Mullan, Ellen Ficklen, and Kyna Rubin).

=== Health Policy Briefs ===
Published since 2009, Health Policy Briefs provide readers with overviews and reviews of evidence on timely topics that are currently being debated in health policy. These briefs are free to access online and are aimed at a broad readership.

=== Podcasts ===
Health Affairs began producing podcasts in 2007 to present audio of nonpartisan analysis and discussions on important health and health care topics. Podcasts feature discussions between Health Affairs editors as well as discussions with outside experts.

== Events ==
Health Affairs hosts a variety of events and briefings that feature presentations from authors of content published in Health Affairs; moderated panel discussions; and one-on-one conversations with researchers, experts, and other leaders in the field. Some events are open to the public, while others are limited to Health Affairs Insider members.

== Fellowships ==
Through its Health Equity Fellowship for Trainees (HEFT) program (established in 2021), Health Affairs provides mentorship to early-career equity researchers. The program competitively selects applicants every 18 months, then pairs them with Health Affairs editors and academic researchers who provide guidance on the academic publishing process.

== Abstracting and Indexing ==
Health Affairs is indexed across many databases:

Major Indexing Services

- Crossref
- Directory of Open Access Journals (DOAJ)
- Google Scholar
- ISI (Institute for Scientific Information)
- PubMed
- Scopus
- Web of Science

Medical and Health Databases

- CINAHL (CINAHL Database, Plus, Complete)
- EMBASE
- MEDLINE (including Ovid MEDLINE)
- NEJM Journal Watch: Emergency Medicine
- Nursing & Allied Health Database
- Health Policy Reference Center
- Health & Medical Collection
- Health Research Premium Collection
- Hospital Premium Collection
- Public Health Database
- Pharmacoeconomics and Outcomes News
- International Pharmaceutical Abstracts (Online)

Social Sciences and Policy Databases

- PAIS Index (Public Affairs Information Service)
- Political Science Complete
- Political Science Database
- Politics Collection
- Public Affairs Index
- Social Services Abstracts
- Social Science Database
- Social Science Premium Collection
- Sociological Abstracts
- SocINDEX (including Full Text)

Business and Management Databases

- ABI/INFORM (Collection, Global, Research, Professional)
- Business Source (Premier, Complete, Elite, Corporate, Corporate Plus, Alumni Edition)
- Business Premium Collection
- Corporate ResourceNet
- Management Contents
- ProQuest (Central, 5000, 5000 International, Pharma Collection, SciTech Collection, Professional Central)
- Cabells Journalytics

Agriculture, Environmental, and Life Sciences

- CAB Abstracts (Commonwealth Agricultural Bureaux)
- Global Health
- AgBiotechNet
- Forest Science Database
- Veterinary Science Database
- TropAg & Rural
- Tropical Diseases Bulletin
- Rural Development Abstracts
- Nutrition Abstracts and Reviews
- Horticultural Science
- Plant Protection Database
- Soil Science Database
- Environmental Science Collection
- Environmental Sciences and Pollution Management
- Environmental Impact
- Agricultural & Environmental Science Database
- Agricultural Economics Database
- Agricultural Engineering Abstracts
- Forestry Abstracts
- Animal Science Database
- Dairy Science Abstracts
- Protozoological Abstracts
- Parasitology Database
- Helminthological Abstracts
- Review of Medical and Veterinary Entomology
- Botanical Pesticides Abstracts
- Postharvest Abstracts
- Potato Abstracts

Interdisciplinary and Other Databases

- Academic Search (Premier, Complete, Elite, Alumni, Main Edition)
- ArticleFirst
- CCC (Copyright Clearance Center)
- Current Abstracts
- Current Contents
- Research Library
- Essential Science Indicators
- Electronic Collections Online
- Google, Google News
- MainFile
- Poetry & Short Story Reference Center
- Leisure Tourism
- Nutrition and Food Sciences Database
- Human Resources Abstracts
- Child Development & Adolescent Studies
- Abstracts in Social Gerontology
- Abstracts in Anthropology
- Abstracts on Hygiene and Communicable Diseases
- Personal Alert (E-mail)
- TOC Premier (Table of Contents)

Interdisciplinary and Other Databases

- HA corpus
- HA corpus for Health Equity Project

== Editors-in-Chief ==
- John K. Iglehart, 1981–2007
- James C. Robinson, 2007–2008
- Susan Dentzer, 2008–2013
- John K. Iglehart (interim), 2013–2014
- Alan R. Weil, 2014–2024
- Donald E. Metz (interim), 2025–present
