= First Watch (restaurant chain) =

American restaurant chain

First Watch Restaurant Group

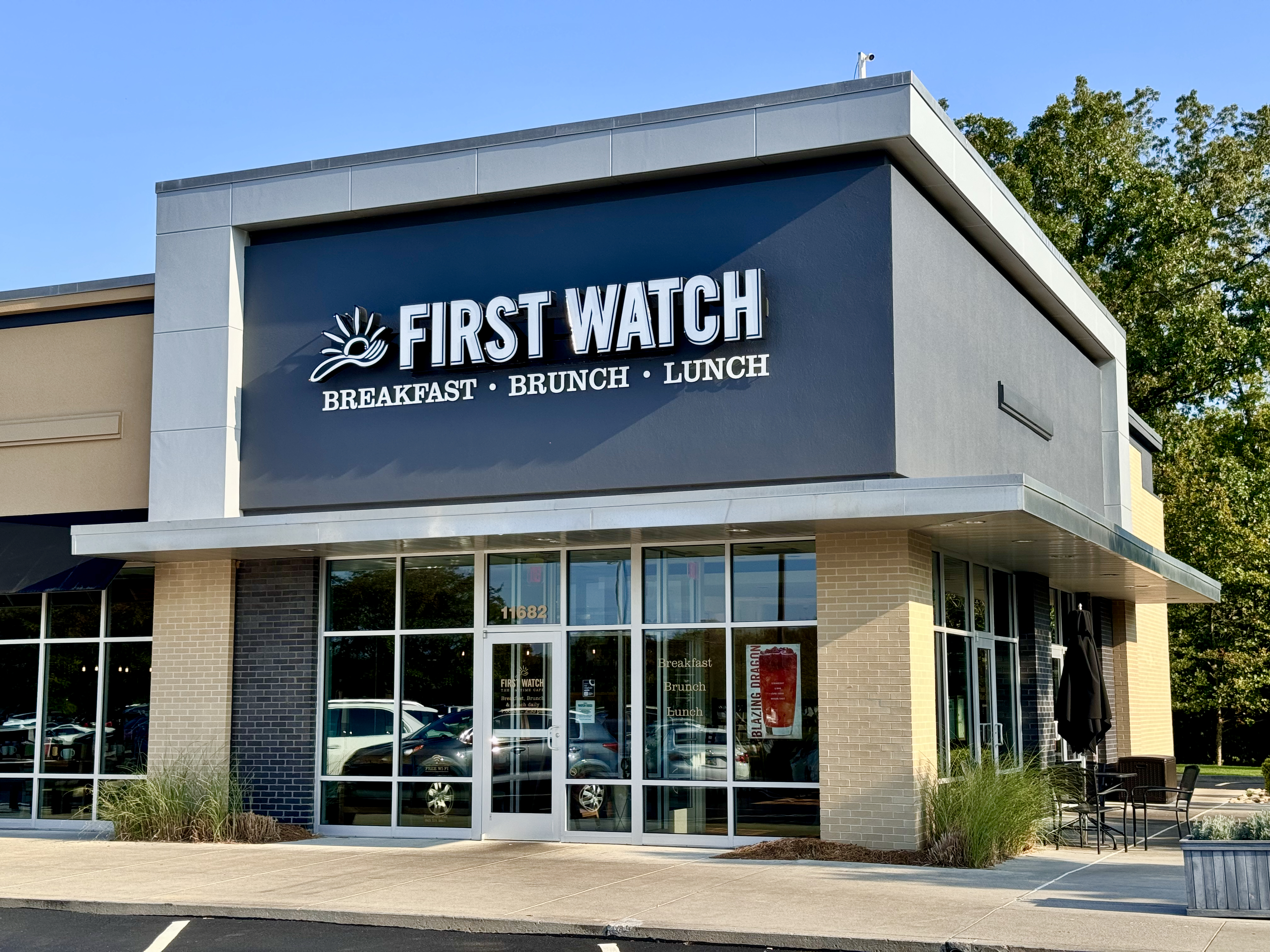
- First Watch in Knoxville, Tennessee
- Trade name: First Watch
- Type: Public
- Traded as: Nasdaq: FWRG
- Industry: Restaurant
- Genre: Casual dining
- Founded: 1983; 43 years ago, in Pacific Grove, California, U.S.
- Founders: Ken Pendery; John Sullivan
- Headquarters: Bradenton, Florida, U.S.
- Number of locations: 680
- Area served: United States
- Key people: Chris Tomasso (CEO)
- Products: Breakfast platters Lunch platters
- Revenue: ▲US$891.551 million (2023)
- Operating income: ▲US$41.267 million (2023)
- Net income: ▲US$25.385 million (2023)
- Total assets: ▲US$1.267 billion (FY 2023)
- Total equity: ▲US$561.284 million (FY 2023)
- Number of employees: 18,000 (2026)
- Subsidiaries: Egg & I Restaurants; Bread & Company
- Website: firstwatch.com

First Watch Restaurant Group, commonly referred to as First Watch, is a daytime-only restaurant chain, specializing in breakfast, brunch and lunch. The company is headquartered in Bradenton, Florida. and operates more than 680 locations in 33 states and has over 18,000 employees.

The restaurant serves made-to-order breakfast, brunch and lunch items including omelets, hashes, pancakes, salads, sandwiches and seasonal dishes. First Watch’s menu rotates multiple times per year to highlight fresh, seasonal ingredients.

First Watch is also the owner of Sun & Fork by First Watch, a fast-casual café concept located in Nashville, Tennessee.

== History ==
The first location was opened in Pacific Grove, California in 1983 by Ken Pendery and John Sullivan. The co-owners founded it after leaving the Le Peep breakfast chain in Colorado. In 1986, they moved their headquarters to Bradenton, Florida.

The name "First Watch" is a nautical reference to the first work shift aboard a ship as First Watch restaurants are only open from 7:00 AM to 2:30 PM.

Expansion

- In 2014, First Watch bought The Good Egg, which is located in Arizona. As of 2021, 18 of The Good Egg restaurants have been converted into First Watch restaurants.
- In May 2015, the company acquired the Colorado-based Egg & I Restaurants chain.
- In 2017, private equity firm Advent International bought a majority stake in First Watch. Advent International bought First Watch from Freeman Spogli & Co., which obtained First Watch in 2011. Freeman Spogli & Co. bought out the 85 percent stake previously held by Catterton Partners. Catterton's stake was acquired in 2004 with a $35 million investment that allowed First Watch to expand in the Southeast and Midwest, doubling the number of First Watch restaurants. First Watch later became a publicly traded company and is no longer owned by Advent International.
- In 2018, First Watch began to source its coffee from Huila, Colombia, to "support hard-working women and their families in Huila in 2018." Royal Cup Coffee, an Alabama-based coffee company, roasts the coffee.
- In October 2021, First Watch went public with an initial public offering, raising $170 million on Nasdaq.
- First Watch has acquired 64 total of its previously franchised restaurants across eight separate acquisitions since May 2023 to April 2025.

== Culture ==
First Watch’s culture emphasizes a hospitality-focused service model centered on daytime operations. The company is known for its “You First” culture and its daytime-only operating model, enabling its teams to enjoy their evenings.

The company offers benefits and wellbeing programs for employees, including mental wellness resources, family support benefits and pet insurance. In 2024, First Watch expanded its family support offerings through a partnership with Bright Horizons, a benefit that received recognition within the restaurant industry.

== Awards ==
First Watch is the recipient of several awards, primarily for its menu and workplace culture:

- In 2026, First Watch was named the #2 Most Loved Workplace in America by the Best Practice Institute, marking its fifth consecutive year on the list.
- In both 2025 and 2024, First Watch was named the #1 Most Loved Workplace in America by the Best Practice Institute, as seen in The Wall Street Journal and Newsweek, respectively.
- In 2023, First Watch was named the top restaurant brand in Yelp's inaugural list of the top 50 most-loved brands in the U.S.
- In 2023 and 2022, First Watch was named a Top 100 Most Loved Workplace® in Newsweek by the Best Practice Institute.
- In 2022, First Watch was awarded a MenuMasters honor by Nation's Restaurant News for its seasonal Braised Short Rib Omelet and recognized with ADP's Culture at Work Award.
