= Linda Douglass =

American political advisor and journalist

Director of Communications for the White House Office of Health Reform
- In office May 2009 – April 2010
- President: Barack Obama
- Preceded by: Position established

Personal details
- Party: Democratic
- Spouse: John R. Phillips
- Children: 1
- Education: University of Southern California (BA)

Linda Douglass is an American political advisor, former government official, and former journalist who served as the head of communications for Bloomberg L.P., as well as a correspondent for ABC News, often reporting for World News Tonight. Douglass had previously served as a communications advisor in the Obama administration.

== Education ==
Douglass earned a Bachelor of Arts degree in psychology from the University of Southern California.

== Career ==
Douglass had a long career as journalist with ABC News and CBS News and covered some of the major events of the 1990s and early 2000s. She was awarded the National Press Foundation's Everett Dirksen Award for Distinguished Coverage of Congress in 1999. She began her journalism career in 1973 with KNXT.

Douglass served as a senior strategist and spokeswoman for the Barack Obama 2008 presidential campaign. Following Obama's victory, Douglass was appointed spokeswoman for the presidential inauguration committee. During President Barack Obama's first term, she was director of communications for the White House Office of Health Reform from 2009 to 2010.

In June 2010, she was named vice president and Head of Corporate and Strategic communications at Atlantic Media, and later became Senior Vice President of Global Communications. In 2013, she moved to Italy when her husband, John Phillips, was named ambassador to Italy. In 2019, she endorsed Pete Buttigieg in the 2020 Democratic Party presidential primaries.

In October 2022, Douglass joined the Council for Responsible Social Media project launched by Issue One to address the negative mental, civic, and public health impacts of social media in the United States co-chaired by former House Democratic Caucus Leader Dick Gephardt and former Massachusetts Lieutenant Governor Kerry Healey.

== Personal life ==
Douglass is married to the former United States ambassador to Italy, John R. Phillips, and they have one daughter.
