= Savers =

Multinational thrift store chain

Savers Value Village Inc.
- Type: Public
- Traded as: NYSE: SVV
- Industry: Retail
- Founded: 1954; 72 years ago San Francisco, California, U.S.
- Headquarters: Bellevue, Washington, U.S.
- Area served: United States; Canada; Australia
- Key people: Mark Walsh; (CEO)
- Products: Second-hand clothing, footwear, bedding, furniture, jewelry, electronics, toys, and housewares
- Revenue: ▲US$1.68 billion (2025)
- Net income: ▼US$22.6 million (2025)
- Website: savers.com

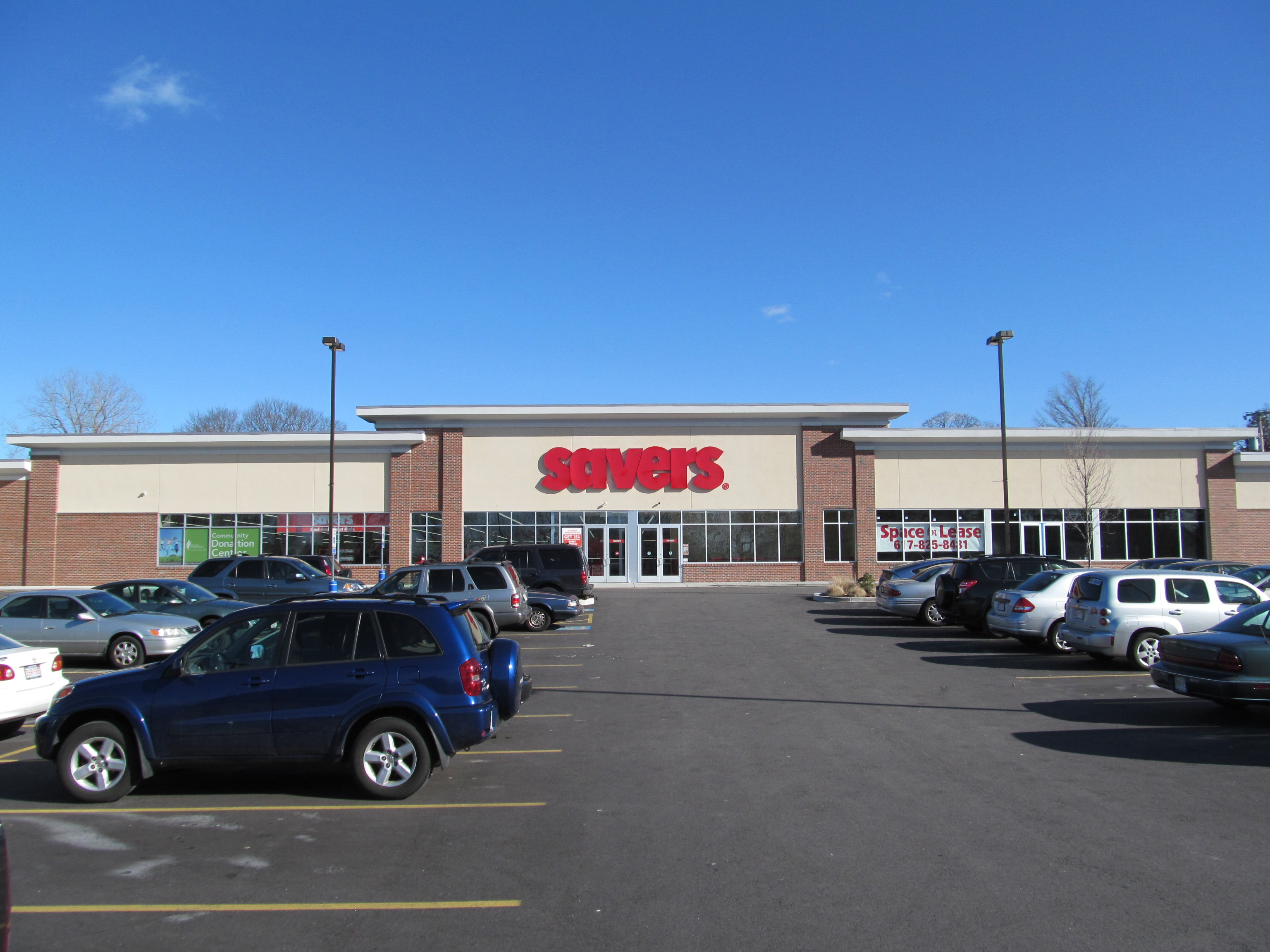
Savers in Boston, Massachusetts

Savers Value Village Inc. is a publicly held, for-profit thrift store retailer headquartered in Bellevue, Washington, United States, offering second hand merchandise, with supermajority ownership by private equity firm Ares Management. An international company, Savers has more than 315 locations throughout the United States, Canada, and Australia, and receives its merchandise by paying money to non-profit organizations for donated clothing and household items. Savers is known as Value Village in the Pacific Northwest, the Baltimore metropolitan area, and most of Canada, and Village des Valeurs in Quebec. Chicago stores and some locations in the Washington, DC metropolitan area are under the name Unique. In other regions of the U.S. and in Australia, the stores are named Savers.

== History ==
The company was founded by Bill Ellison in 1954 at a former movie theater in the Mission District of San Francisco, California. By 1970, the chain had six thrift stores in the states of California, Oregon, and Washington under various names, including Value Village and Thrift Village. The company's headquarters were moved to Bellevue, Washington in 1970 and expanded to Canada with a store in Vancouver that opened in 1980. In October 1997, the first Savers store in Australia opened in Brunswick, Victoria. Ellison was the chairman of the company until 2000; he died in 2008.

Berkshire Partners bought a 50% stake in the company in 2000. Freeman Spogli & Co. became the majority owner in 2006. Leonard Green & Partners and TPG Capital bought out Freeman's shares in 2012.

In March 2019, Savers reached a restructuring agreement to hand ownership of the company over to private equity firms Ares Management and Crescent Capital Group. Ares acquired Crescent's stake in 2021 and took the company public in a June 29, 2023 initial public offering, retaining an 88% ownership stake.

== Business operations ==
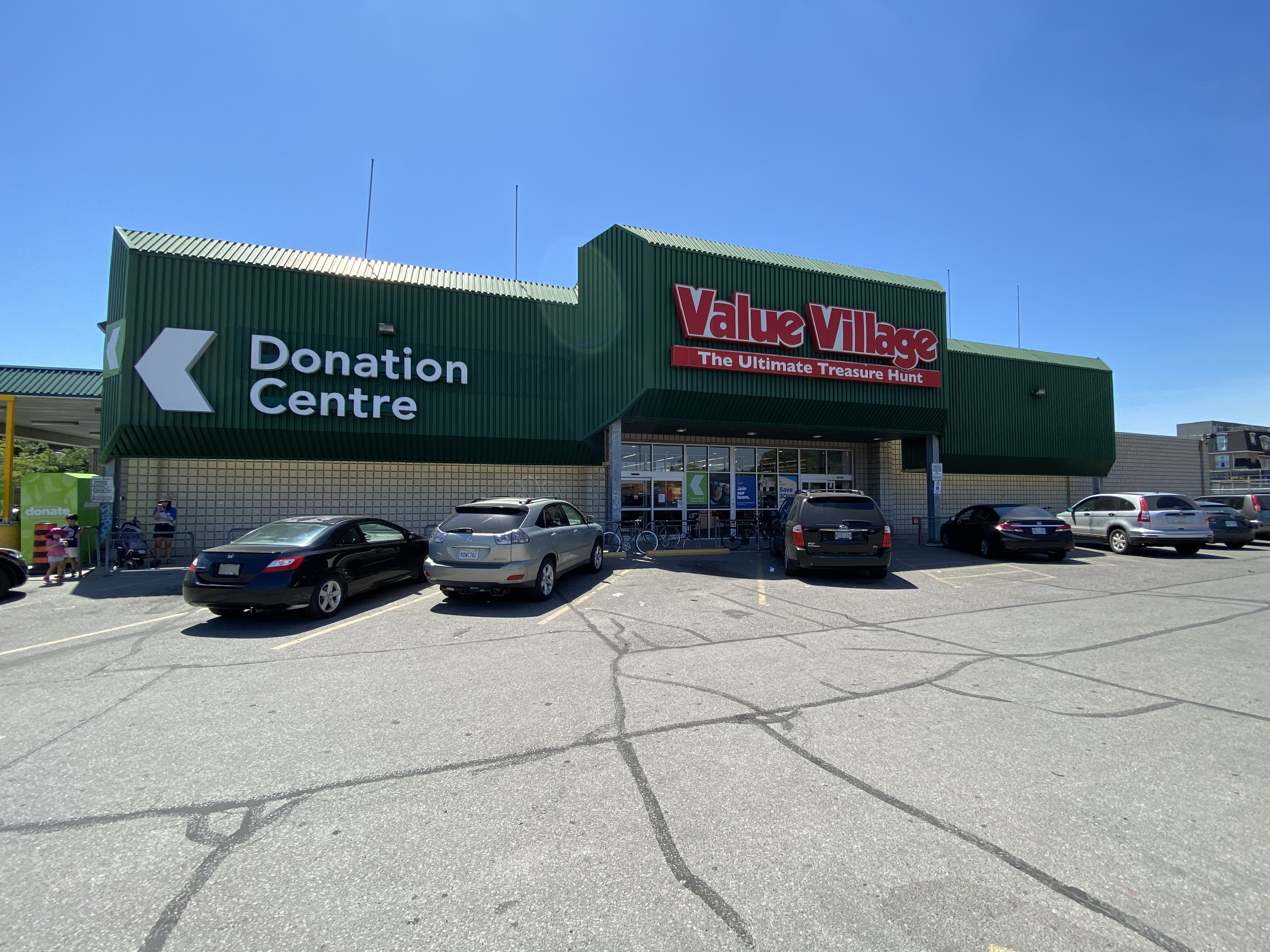
A Value Village on Bloor Street in Toronto, Canada

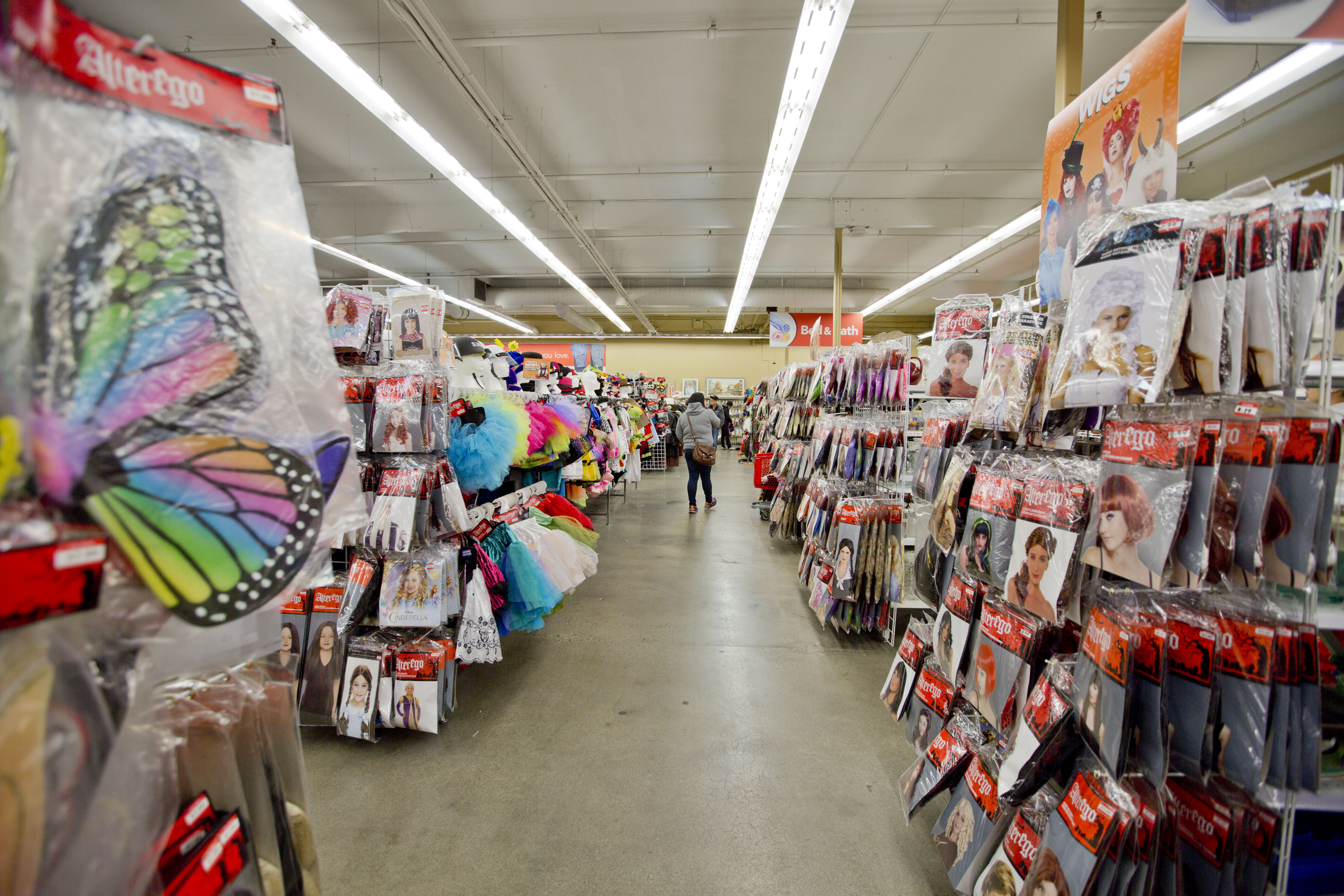
Value Village interior

Savers' business model involves partnership with local non-profits and purchasing and reselling donated items. The non-profits collect and deliver donated goods to Savers, which pays them for the items at a bulk rate regardless of whether they ever make it to the sales floor. As of 2011, the company had paid $1.1 billion to approximately 130 nonprofit partners, and as of 2012, had 315 stores worldwide and reached $1 billion in revenue.

Items deemed resellable are displayed for purchase in stores. Savers also has a recycling program and attempts to recycle any reusable items that cannot be sold at the stores, as well as any items that do not sell over a period of time to make room for fresh merchandise. Savers has buyers for its recyclables throughout the world and attempts to keep as much donated product out of the waste stream as possible. In Minnesota, Savers pays non-profit partners $0.053 per pound of clothing, $0.035 per pound of homewares, $0.02 per pound of books and $0.02 per pound of large items (e.g., furniture). By the end of 2018, the company had discontinued the use of plastic bags in its stores.

According to Diabetes Canada, it has had a reusable goods donation program with Value Village where donations of clothing and small household items generate $5,000,000 CAD annually to support diabetes research.

== Controversy ==
In May 2015, the Minnesota Attorney General filed suit claiming that Savers was misleading the public, paying only a very small percentage to the non-profit charities which partner with the company. Savers settled in June 2015, increasing transparency and paying $300,000 to each of its partner charities in Minnesota to compensate for fundraising disruptions. In the same year, the Attorney General filed suit against the Epilepsy Foundation for failing to monitor Savers for compliance with their partnership contract. Money raised through their partnership with Savers accounted for 38-50% of the Epilepsy Foundation's revenue.

In November 2019 King County Superior Court Judge Roger Rogoff ruled that the corporation had misled the public into believing the organization was a charity, but the ruling was overturned in August 2021 by a Washington state appeals court. The Washington Supreme Court further ruled that the Washington Attorney General's Office violated the corporation's First Amendment rights. Subsequently, King County Superior Court Judge David Whedbee ruled that the state of Washington had to pay the corporation's legal expenses due to the Attorney General's Office's aggressive litigation.

=== Safety concerns ===
In December 2018, a family in Pitt Meadows, British Columbia, Canada reported their six-year-old son found a hypodermic needle and two partially-used tubes of glue in a used Mouse Trap board game they had bought from a Value Village in Coquitlam, British Columbia.

In October 2019, a man reported getting a needlestick injury when he tried on a boot at a Value Village (in New Westminster, British Columbia, Canada) and was told he would need blood tests including for HIV and hepatitis.

Pricing

In Canada, Value Village has seen frequent criticism for its alleged unfair pricing.

CBC News reported that shoppers were finding items marked up higher than they were new. In response, a spokesperson for the company said that "Customers should feel free to chat with a store manager if they think that an item has been inadvertently mispriced so we can quickly address it."

Valentina Guerra of the Brock Press heavily criticized the company. She echoed complaints about removing paid worker positions in favor of self-checkout machines, opening expensive boutiques in Toronto and raising prices on secondhand items. She claimed that the company's actions as a company were unethical and recommended other consumers to boycott them.
