= Santa Monica Civic Auditorium =

Convention center in Santa Monica, California

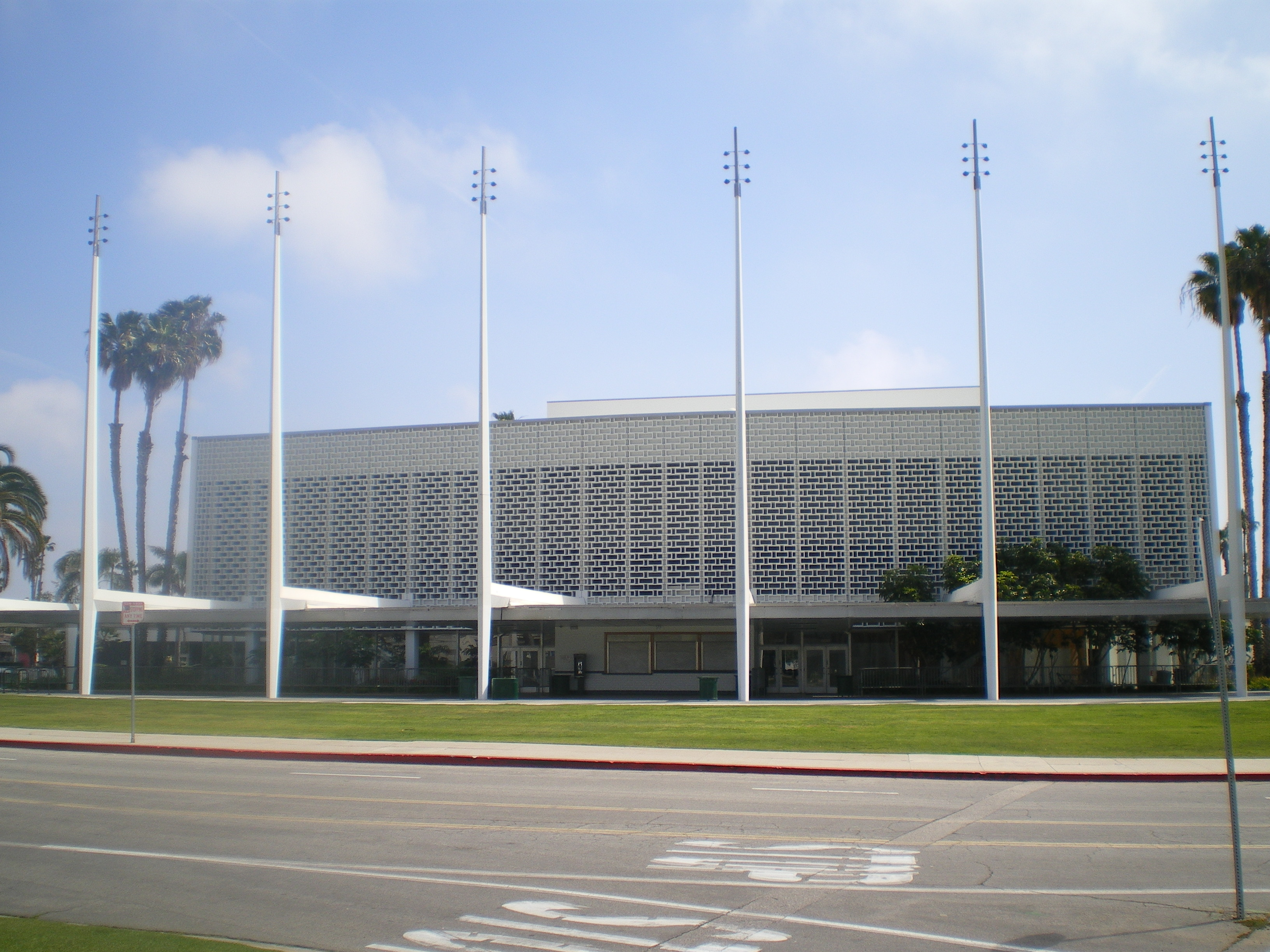
- Santa Monica Civic Auditorium

- Location within the Los Angeles metropolitan area
- 34°0′32″N 118°29′21″W

History
- Built: 1958

Site notes
- Architect(s): Welton Becket & Associates

Santa Monica Historic Landmark
- Designated: 9 April 2002

U.S. National Register of Historic Places
- Designated: 16 October 2024
- Reference no.: 100010919

Santa Monica Civic Auditorium is a multi-purpose convention center at 1855 Main Street in Santa Monica, California, owned by the City of Santa Monica. It was built in 1958 by Millie and Severson General Contractors and designed by Welton Becket and as a concert venue, it has a seating capacity of 3,000. It is a city-designated landmark, and is listed on the National Register of Historic Places.

== Architecture ==
The building was made of reinforced concrete and combined elements of a theater, concert hall, and trade show and convention auditorium. Parabolic pylons supported the exterior grand cantilevered canopy fronting a glass curtain wall and brise soleil, a patterned wall that reduced the effects of the sun's glare.

For trade shows, the Civic Auditorium features 11,775 ft^{2} (1,093.9 m^{2}), while the stage adds 4,485 ft^{2} (416.7 m^{2}) more space, for a total of 16,260 ft^{2} (1,511 m^{2}). The East Wing meeting room adds an additional 4,200 ft^{2} (390 m^{2}), while the main lobby features 6,708 ft^{2} (623.2 m^{2}).

The main hall of the Civic is adaptable for not only trade shows, but also sporting events, concerts, meetings, awards shows and other events. As a concert venue it can seat 3,000, as a banquet hall 720 in tables, and as a sports arena it can seat up to 2,500. The most widely touted innovation was the auditorium's main floor, which in a matter of seconds could be tilted by a hydraulic mechanism to form raked seating for theatrical productions or a flat surface for dancing or exhibits. The main floor of the auditorium can thus be raised or lowered to create a raked floor for theatre seating or a level floor for exhibits.

The parcel includes the auditorium and surrounding land bounded on the north by the county building, on the west by Main Street, on the east by 4th Street and on the south by Pico Boulevard.

== History ==
The Santa Monica Civic Auditorium opened in summer 1958, then the second-largest auditorium in the Los Angeles area. It was constructed in what was formally known as Belmar, the first African American community in Santa Monica. The land was secured through the use of eminent domain.

The $2.9-million city-owned project soon became an acclaimed music venue, for artists as varied as David Bowie, Sonic Youth, Dinosaur, Jr., Screaming Trees, Cell, Fluf, The Cramps, Klaus Nomi, Top Jimmy & The Rhythm Pigs, Eric Clapton, Frank Sinatra, Village People, Mötley Crüe, Dave Brubeck, Laura Nyro, The Limeliters, Ella Fitzgerald, Elton John, Free, Traffic, Prince, Tim Buckley and Bob Dylan. On October 28 and 29, 1964, the auditorium was host to the T.A.M.I. Show, a filmed concert featuring James Brown and The Rolling Stones. A home of the Academy Awards from 1961 to 1968, the auditorium remains home to the Santa Monica Symphony Orchestra. Pink Floyd performed there on May 1, 1970.

George Carlin's album Class Clown was recorded at the auditorium on May 27, 1972, and was released later that year on September 29. Carlin first performed his infamous monologue "Seven Words You Can Never Say on Television" at the show's finale. On July 21, 1972, Carlin was arrested and charged with violating obscenity laws after performing the routine at Summerfest.

The Eagles performed three consecutive shows during The Long Run Tour on July 27–29, 1980. The show was recorded and mostly featured on their live album, entitled Eagles Live. Blue Öyster Cult played in support of its Club Ninja album in March 1986; the show was recorded for radio broadcast, and several songs from the performance were finally made available as part of a box set in 2012, including the never-before released "Wings Of Mercury".

On April 9, 1982, "Weird Al" Yankovic made his first major appearance at the auditorium, when his band opened for Missing Persons. It was not a happy experience; "I got pelted for 45 minutes", he later said, "(with) anything that wasn't nailed down".

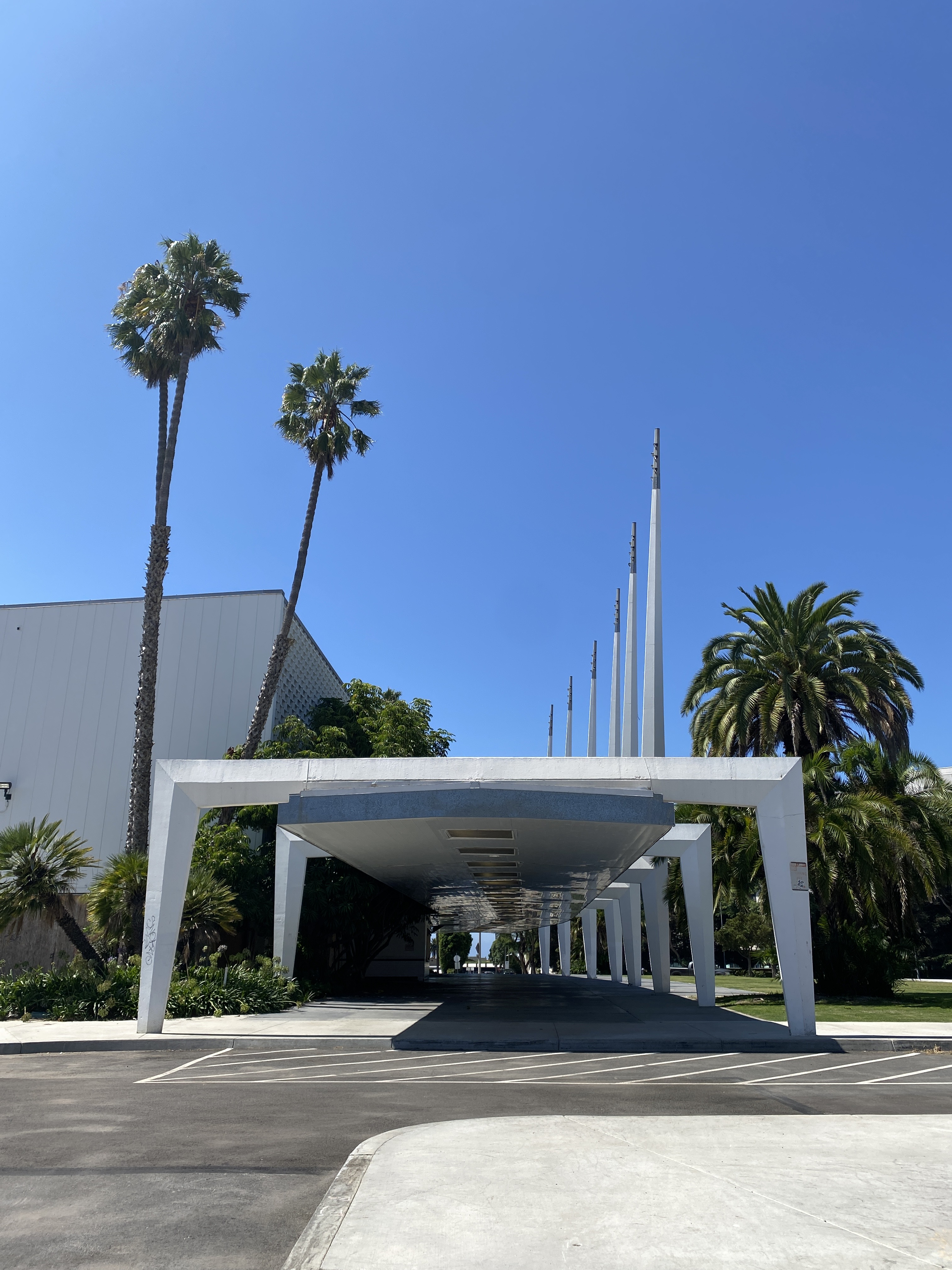
Santa Monica Civic Auditorium entrance pavilion

In 1986, the Santa Monica City Council discussed a preliminary report containing four plans calling for various combinations of office buildings, a hotel, a museum, a conference center, a playhouse, parking garages and open space and, in two of the plans, demolition of the auditorium. By the 2000s, the Civic Auditorium was operating at an annual deficit of as much as $2 million, which the city has had to cover. The City of Santa Monica began to plan for a $51.9-million renovation using redevelopment funds and negotiated with the Nederlander Organization to book events. That effort was suspended after Governor Jerry Brown dissolved community redevelopment agencies. Per the Santa Monica Mirror newspaper, the auditorium was expected to close in July 2013 for at least five years. It needs at least $23 million in seismic and accessibly upgrades. A complete renovation would exceed $50 million. From an economic perspective, it would be cheaper to replace it, but it is a city designated landmark. The city has an annual budget of more than half of a billion dollars and is considering its priorities.

Phish made their only appearance at the venue on December 10, 1994, which was the final show of their 1994 fall tour.

"As of 2016 the Santa Monica Civic Auditorium is currently available for limited filming, photo shoots, private events, and meetings". The Civic Auditorium parking lot is also used for shows like the AltCar Expo Conference that took place in September 2016. The AltCar Expo features hi-tech electric vehicles equipped with latest technology.

In late 2023, the city of Santa Monica received a letter of interest from RPG, a group consisting of Oak View Group, Live Nation and others, to restore the property into a seated concert venue. The city initially signed a six month exclusive negotiating agreement with the group but, after several rounds of negotiations, the city abandoned the exclusive negotiations, citing project costs, feasibility and potential cost overruns. In 2026, a proposal to demolish the existing structure and develop a Santa Monica Global Conference Center was proposed by Joe DiRosa, citing local development of the area which brought into question the property's viability as a music venue . It was reported that world renowned architectural firm Morphosis, founded by Pritzker Prize winner Thom Mayne, had joined the initiative for a conference center, agreeing to do an initial study to determine the sites possible uses, with the intent they would be the architect of choice if the project moves forward.

== See also ==
- AltCar Expo
- List of convention centers in the United States
