= Julia Thorne =

American writer (1944–2006)

Second Lady of Massachusetts
- In role March 6, 1983 – January 2, 1985
- Lieutenant Governor: John Kerry
- Preceded by: Susan Dwight (1975)
- Succeeded by: Jan Cellucci (1991)

Personal details
- Born: Julia Stimson Thorne; September 16, 1944 New York City, U.S.
- Died: April 27, 2006 (aged 61) Concord, Massachusetts, U.S.
- Cause of death: Cancer
- Spouses: John Kerry (m. 1970; div. 1988); Richard Charlesworth (m. 1997)
- Children: Alexandra; Vanessa
- Relatives: David S. Barry (great-grandfather); David Thorne (twin brother)
- Occupation: Writer

Julia Stimson Thorne (September 16, 1944 – April 27, 2006) was an American writer. She was the first wife of John Kerry, who was a U.S. Senator during their marriage.

== Biography ==
Thorne was born in New York City on September 16, 1944, the daughter of Alice (Barry) and Landon Ketchum Thorne Jr. Her maternal great-grandfather was journalist David S. Barry. Thorne spent much of her childhood in Rome where her father worked various jobs. She graduated from the Foxcroft School in 1962. She also took some classes at the New York School of Interior Design and at Radcliffe.

Julia Thorne was a direct eleventh generation descendant of John Bowne, a defiant activist in the struggle for religious freedom. William Thorne Sr., third signatory of the Flushing Remonstrance is also an ancestor. Thorne was also a distant cousin of her husband John Kerry through their common ancestor Elizabeth Fones.

Thorne married John Kerry on May 23, 1970, and wore a dress that was over "two centuries old." She and Kerry had two daughters together, Alexandra Forbes Kerry and Vanessa Bradford Kerry. During their marriage, Julia began showing signs of depression and later wrote that she had at one time contemplated suicide. In the 1980s, she created a nonprofit called the Depression Initiative to educate people about depression. Thorne and Kerry were divorced on July 25, 1988 after a six-year separation. She overcame depression by 1990, and by all accounts the two had an amicable relationship. She married Richard J. Charlesworth in 1997 and they moved to Bozeman, Montana. She continued to be supportive of Kerry's run for president in 2004. Thorne died from cancer on April 27, 2006, in her home in Concord, Massachusetts.

== Books ==
Her book, You Are Not Alone: Words of Experience and Hope for the Journey Through Depression (1993) (with Larry Rothstein) (ISBN 0-06-096977-6) collects accounts of different people who have faced depression. Ann Landers wrote that "this little book could be a lifesaver and the best $10 you will ever spend."

A Change of Heart: Words of Experience and Hope for the Journey Through Divorce (1996) (ISBN 0-06-095105-2)
