= Stephen M. Cutler =

American lawyer

Stephen M. Cutler is an American lawyer who currently serves as a partner and Global Head of the Government and Internal Investigations practice at the law firm Simpson Thacher & Bartlett. He was previously the Director of the Division of Enforcement for the U.S. Securities and Exchange Commission from 2001 until 2005. He previously spent most of his career at the law firm Wilmer Cutler Pickering Hale and Dorr, and became General Counsel of JPMorgan Chase in February, 2007.

After graduating from Yale University with a B.A. (summa cum laude), Cutler earned a J.D. from Yale Law School where he was an editor for the Yale Law Journal. Cutler law clerked for Judge Dorothy Nelson on the Federal Court of Appeals for the Ninth Circuit and then worked for the Center for Law in the Public Interest in Los Angeles.

In 2016, Bloomberg reported that Cutler, then-general counsel of JPMorgan Chase, had been participating in secret meetings with his counterparts at Bank of America, UBS Group AG, Barclays Plc, Citigroup Inc., Goldman Sachs Group Inc., and Deutsche Bank AG in order to discuss a collective legal strategy on matters of pressing concern to the financial institutions represented.
