= A123 Hymotion =

Subsidiary company of A123Systems

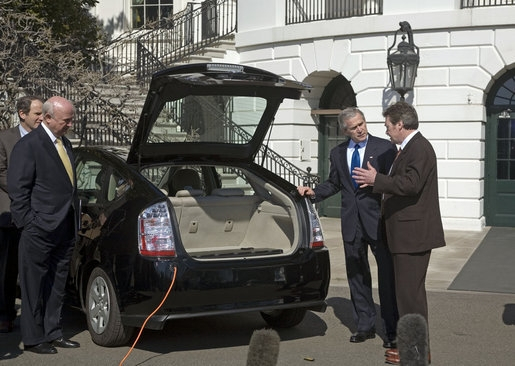
President Bush with Dave Vieau, A123Systems CEO, examining a Hymotion-converted Toyota Prius on the White House.

A123 Hymotion is a subsidiary company of A123Systems.

== History ==
It was founded in 2005 in Toronto, Ontario, Canada, as Hymotion. It introduced plug-in hybrid electric vehicle (PHEV) upgrade kits in February 2006. In February 2007, Hymotion was acquired by A123Systems, the manufacturer of the batteries that Hymotion uses for upgrades.

== Products ==
Designed for the Toyota Prius and the Ford Escape and Mariner Hybrids, these kits can be purchased by individuals for the Prius and professionally installed by 17 different certified companies in Canada and the United States.

== Awards and citations ==
The South Coast Air Quality Management District awarded Hymotion to convert 10 Toyota Prius hybrid vehicles to PHEVs.

== See also ==
- Aftermarket kit
