= Alexandra Kerry =

American filmmaker (born 1973)

- Born: Alexandra Forbes Kerry; September 5, 1973 (age 52); Concord, Massachusetts, U.S.
- Education: Milton Academy
- Alma mater: Brown University (BA); AFI Conservatory (MFA)
- Occupations: Filmmaker; actress
- Spouse: Julien Dobbs-Higginson
- Children: 2
- Parents: John Forbes Kerry; Julia Stimson Thorne
- Relatives: Forbes family

Alexandra Forbes Kerry (born September 5, 1973) is an American actress and filmmaker. She is a partner at Locomotive Films and co-founder of Fictional Pictures, a film production company based in New York and Los Angeles. She is married to art curator Julien Dobbs-Higginson and they have two daughters named Isabelle (born 2014) and Allegra (born 2017).

== Early life and education ==
Alexandra Forbes Kerry was born in Concord, Massachusetts on September 5, 1973. She is the elder daughter of politician John Forbes Kerry from the Forbes family and writer Julia Stimson Thorne. Her younger sister Vanessa is a doctor.

Kerry graduated from the Milton Academy and then attended Brown University, where she studied anthropology and modern culture and media. In 2004 she graduated with an MFA in directing from the AFI Conservatory's two-year masters filmmaker program.

== Career ==
=== Acting and filmmaking ===
Kerry's short film The Last Full Measure premiered at the 2004 Cannes Film Festival and earned her top honors at the Austin Film Festival. The film also earned her the "Director of the Year" award from American Film Institute. The film was in collection at the Los Angeles County Museum of Art.

She is a co-producer of the 2008 documentary film Be Like Others. Kerry has also had several roles in television and in film. She has appeared in two David Mamet films, State and Main in 2000 and Spartan in 2004.

As a television director, she has directed the commercial, including the pilot and first season of MTV's The Hills - and the pilot for the 2002 film The Forest. She has also co-produced several documentaries including the award-winning Be Like Others for HBO, and has won two Silver Tellies for producing and directing on an online ad campaign for Allstate Insurance.

=== Locomotive ===
In 2011, Kerry joined Locomotive, a New York-based independent film production and financing company. Lucy Barzun Donnelly founded Locomotive in 2007 and her producing credits include Pieces of April, Grey Gardens, Friends With Kids, A Bag of Hammers, That's What She Said, and The Go-Getter.

== Political activity ==
After completing her graduate studies at the American Film Institute, Kerry joined her sister Vanessa on the campaign trail to campaign for their father, speaking as a surrogate for her father's 2004 presidential bid. She made a speech introducing her father at the 2004 Democratic National Convention.

She also appeared alongside former Vice President Al Gore, during a campaign stop in Hawaii, and was later photographed celebrating her 30th birthday aboard a campaign plane with her family. Many of Kerry's speeches touched on issues that affected women her age and a younger demographic, preferring to make campaign stops at university campuses.

Kerry appeared in print, being interviewed by Ben Affleck for the September 2004 issue of Harper's Bazaar, as well as Vogue, USA Today and a number of other magazines. She also appeared on the MTV Music Video Awards in Miami with Vanessa joining George W. Bush's daughters Barbara and Jenna, who were campaigning for their father, George W. Bush, to encourage youth and citizen voting. and Larry King Live three times. Jenna later confirmed that Barbara and Jenna also developed a friendship with John Kerry's daughters, Alexandra and Vanessa.

In September 2008, she published her first book titled Notes from the Trail: Presidential Politics from the Inside Out. The memoir and art book featured photographs from the campaign trail taken by Kerry, as well as CJ Gunther, Hector Mata and Dina Rudick, and highlighted her experiences with the political process of elections. Publishers Weekly called the memoir "Kerry-sensitive, thoughtful, and observant" and that "one of the book's unique charms is an intimate look at a political campaign through the eyes of an artist."

Kerry joined her father on the campaign trail for Barack Obama's successful 2008 presidential campaign. In 2012, Kerry founded Ad Your Voice, a super PAC that allowed voters to create their own political ads in favor of President Barack Obama's re-election effort, with environmental journalist Amanda Griscom Little.

Kerry is currently a board member of the National Parks Conservation Association and a supporter of the American Ballet Theatre.

== Filmography ==
=== Film ===
Year	Title	Role	Notes
2000	State and Main	Television Director	
2002	The Forest	Director	Pilot/Commercial
2004	Spartan	Bartender	
2004	The Last Full Measure	Director, writer	Won – Best Short Award - St. Louis International Film Festival; Won – Best Student Short Film Award - Austin Film Festival
2008	Be Like Others	Co-producer	
2018	Look Away	Producer	

=== Television ===
Year	Title	Role	Notes
2003	Mister Sterling	Karen	7 episodes
2006	The Hills	Director	Season 1 Pilot/Commercial

== Bibliography ==
- Kerry, Alexandra (2008). Notes from the Trail: Presidential Politics from the Inside Out. Rodale, Inc. ISBN 978-1-60529-980-8
