= Batteries Plus =

American battery franchise

Batteries Plus LLC
- Type: Private
- Industry: Retail
- Founded: November 1988; 37 years ago in Green Bay, Wisconsin
- Founder: Ron Rezetko
- Headquarters: Hartland, Wisconsin, U.S.
- Number of locations: 730+ (as of 2025)
- Area served: United States; Puerto Rico
- Key people: Scott K. Williams (CEO) Jon Sica (COO)
- Products: Batteries, light bulbs, phone accessories, emergency and disaster prep items
- Services: Device repair, phone repair, tablet repair, key fob programming, key cutting, battery installation
- Website: www.batteriesplus.com

Batteries Plus, stylized as Batteries+ (formerly Batteries Plus Bulbs, stylized as Batteries+Bulbs) is an American local specialty battery franchise that specializes in batteries, light bulbs, and device repair. Since its founding in 1988, the company has grown to 700+ retail locations with its corporate headquarters located in Hartland, Wisconsin. The stores are known for carrying many out of production and hard to find batteries for older appliances and antique cars.

== History ==
Ron Rezetko founded Batteries Plus in 1988, opening the first store in Green Bay, Wisconsin. The company began as a specialized retailer focusing solely on batteries for a wide variety of applications including consumer electronics, automotive, industrial, and specialty use. As demand grew, the company expanded its offerings to include light bulbs and later added services such as smartphone repair and key fob programming.

In 1992, Batteries Plus began franchising, with the first franchise location opened by Dan and Susan Manwaring in Fort Wayne, Indiana. In 1998, the company established its corporate headquarters in Hartland, Wisconsin.

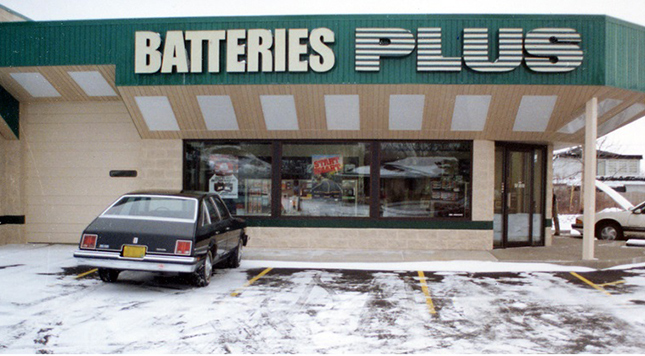
The first Batteries Plus store was opened in Green Bay, Wisconsin, in 1988.

Batteries Plus Bulbs was acquired by Roark Capital Group in November 2007. Batteries Plus began offering franchise opportunities in 2010, which significantly accelerated its national expansion. In 2013, the brand changed its name to Batteries Plus Bulbs to reflect its broader product line. In July 2014 they rolled out a nationwide cell phone and tablet repair service. In 2016 they expanded services to include automotive key cutting and programming.

In July 2016, Los Angeles based private equity firm, Freeman Spogli & Co., acquired Batteries Plus Bulbs from Roark.

In 2021, the company rebranded to its original name, Batteries Plus, and introduced the tagline "Power it. Light it. Fix it." to emphasize its range of products and services.

2024–2025 expansion

In 2024, Batteries Plus signed 57 new franchise agreements across 11 states and opened 30 new stores. In the first quarter of 2025, the company signed an additional 17 franchise agreements and opened eight new stores in seven states, including its first location in Hawaii. This brought the chain’s footprint to 48 U.S. states.

== Marketing ==
In May 2025, Batteries Plus launched a nationwide brand campaign titled "The Experts In Charge," which highlighted store associates as technical experts and emphasized personalized, in-store customer service across its network of over 730 locations.

== Supply chain ==
Between 2018 and 2025, Batteries Plus reduced its reliance on Chinese imports from 32% to 4% by diversifying sourcing to the United States, Vietnam, Malaysia, and other countries. This shift was intended to mitigate the impact of tariffs and strengthen the company’s supply chain resilience.

== Sustainability ==
In February 2025, to commemorate National Battery Day, Batteries Plus partnered with Cirba Solutions to promote battery recycling at more than 730 locations across the United States. The initiative aimed to recover critical minerals from used batteries and raise consumer awareness about responsible disposal.

== Products and services ==
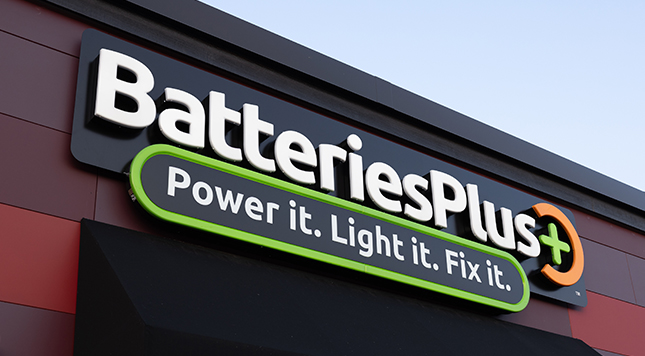

Batteries Plus offers a wide range of products and services. The company's main products are batteries, including batteries for vehicles, smartphones, laptops, hearing aids, marine equipment, and industrial uses. Since the early 2010s, Batteries Plus has offered a variety of lighting solutions, including LED, CFL, halogen, and specialty bulbs. In 2014, the company started offering device repair for smartphones and tablets, as well as key fob programming and replacement services.

== Business model ==
Batteries Plus operates under a franchise model. Many locations are independently owned and operated but follow corporate operations, product offering requirements, and customer service standards. Franchisees benefit from centralized marketing, supply chain management, and training programs.
