= Seed Global Health =

- Founded: July 2012; 13 years ago (formerly Global Health Service Corps)
- Type: Non-profit NGO
- Purpose: Humanitarian (public health)
- Headquarters: Boston, Massachusetts, U.S.
- Region served: Sub-Saharan Africa
- CEO: Vanessa Kerry, MD, MSc
- Chief Medical Officer: Sadath Sayeed, MD, JD
- Affiliations: Peace Corps, Massachusetts General Hospital Center for Global Health, PEPFAR
- Website: seedglobalhealth.org

Seed Global Health, formerly known as Global Health Service Corps, is a non-profit organization started in 2011 which helps to provide nursing and medical training support in resource-limited countries. Seed Global Health collaborates with the Peace Corps to create the Global Health Service Partnership (GHSP). This program has established the first "Peace Corps for doctors and nurses". Since launch, GHSP has had 97 volunteers train more than 8,300 students in 5 African countries.

== History ==
The Global Health Service Partnership was developed from efforts dating back more than half a century. Building on a vision outlined in a 2 am speech, U.S. President John F. Kennedy created the Peace Corps by Executive Order in 1961. In 1979, Senator Javits proposed the International Health Act of 1979, which aimed to build an International Health Service program. The act never passed. Finally, in 2003, the US government established the President’s Emergency Program for AIDS Relief (PEPFAR), the first major health program of its scale. This established a need for increased human resources to help execute the program. In 2005, the Institute of Medicine released its influential report, Healer’s Abroad: Americans Responding to the Human Resource Crisis in HIV/AIDS, which detailed a Global Health Service Corps that would send full-time, paid professionals abroad not only to address in-country health care needs, but also to offer clinical, technical, and managerial guidance to foreign health care workers. That same year, Senator William Frist (R, Tennessee) introduced a bill in 2005 which legislated for a Global Health Corps “…to improve the health, welfare, and development of communities in select foreign countries and regions…” To achieve this goal, the Global Health Corps would send volunteers abroad to address a range of needs, including but not limited to, health care treatment and education, hygiene and food preparation training, disease surveillance, and technical health support.

Between 2005 and 2010, many of the original authors and champions of Healers Abroad continued their campaign. Notably, Fitzhugh Mullan, Chair of the Healers Abroad Committee, wrote an opinion-editorial for the Journal of the American Medical Association in which he described other nations creating GHSP-like programs and proposed a model that blended the strengths of the Peace Corps and the National Health Service Corps. Another bill was drafted in the United States Senate in 2008 and in 2010, a bill was being scripted in the House. Between 2009 and 2010, the Institute of Medicine released two reports, of which one focused on the importance of health to international development and diplomacy, and the other on the critical need for health-based human resources to strengthen the HIV/AIDS, tuberculosis, and malaria efforts. Furthermore, in September 2010, physicians Paul Farmer, Sara Auld, and Vanessa Kerry’s Perspectives piece in the New England Journal of Medicine reinvigorated the argument for a program comparable to GHSP. It noted the importance of health to development and of the possibility of sending U.S. doctors, nurses, and other health professionals abroad in a partnership program to provide education, investment in capacity of local health professionals, and support for health system strengthening. It outlined a vision of loan repayment to ensure that financial obligations were not a barrier to service. The piece gained attention and GHSP planning efforts resumed. Vanessa Kerry and Sara Auld started a grassroots campaign online, created a petition, and began to connect to many of its original champions. Among them were Fitzhugh Mullan, Michele Barry, Senior Associate Dean for Global Health and Director of Global Health Programs in Medicine at Stanford University School of Medicine, and Ed O'Neil Jr., founder and president of OmniMed, and to those already engaged in similar work such as Baylor College of Medicine and its Pediatric AIDS Corps. In an op-ed in The Huffington Post, Anand Reddi proposed integrating the GHSC within the President's Emergency Plan for AIDS Relief.

In October 2010, the Institute of Politics at the Kennedy School of Government hosted a forum with a panel that included three former directors of the Peace Corps and the current director, Aaron S. Williams. Vanessa Kerry and Sara Auld attended the event and asked the directors: "What did the Peace Corp directors think about sending doctors, nurses, and other health professionals abroad as Peace Corps Volunteer medical educators to invest in human resources for health?" All four directors responded favorably.

== Volunteer deployments ==
GHSP was officially announced in March 2012. Applications for Global Health Service Partnership Peace Corps Volunteers (GHSP PCVs) opened in July 2012 and closed on December 1, 2012. In July 2013, the first nursing and physician volunteers were deployed. Since its launch it has grown exponentially, with 30 volunteers in the first year and 71 currently on deployment across its five countries. Seed, through GHSP, now supports medical and nursing schools in Liberia, Malawi, Swaziland, Tanzania, and Uganda. The volunteers come from all regions of the U.S. and represent all stages of their careers.

== Leadership ==
Seed Global Health is led by CEO Vanessa Kerry. Board leaders include Fitzhugh Mullan, former Assistant Surgeon General and professor at George Washington University School of Public Health and Health Services, anthropologist Paul Farmer, and Aaron S. Williams.
