= Vanessa Kerry =

American physician and public health expert

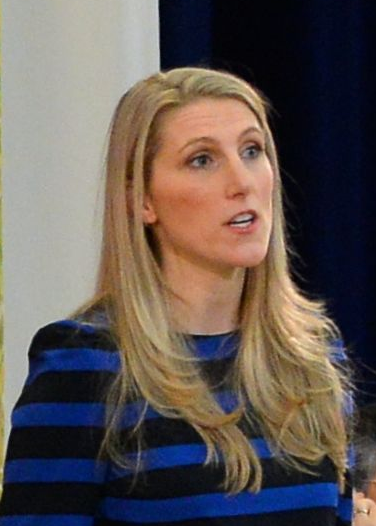
- Kerry in 2014
- Born: Vanessa Bradford Kerry; December 31, 1976 (age 49); Boston, Massachusetts, U.S.
- Education: Yale University (BS); London School of Economics; London School of Hygiene and Tropical Medicine (MSc); Harvard University (MD)
- Occupations: Physician; public health expert; doctor
- Spouse: Brian Vala Nahed (m. 2009)
- Children: 2
- Parent(s): John Forbes Kerry; Julia Stimson Thorne
- Relatives: Forbes family
- Website: www.seedglobalhealth.org

Vanessa Bradford Kerry (born December 31, 1976) is an American physician, public health expert, and advocate. She is a founder of the non-profit Seed Global Health, director of the Program in Global Public Policy and Social Change at Harvard Medical School, and serves as the Special Envoy for Climate Change and Health for the World Health Organization (WHO).

== Early life and education ==
Kerry was born in Boston, Massachusetts, on December 31, 1976. She is the younger daughter of politician John Forbes Kerry and writer Julia Stimson Thorne. Her older sister Alexandra is an actress, filmmaker, director and producer. After her parents divorced, she moved with her mother to Bozeman, Montana. She attended Phillips Academy in Andover, Massachusetts for high school.

Kerry graduated from Phillips Academy, Andover and summa cum laude from Yale University with a major in biology. While a student at Yale, she played for the varsity lacrosse team for four years. After graduating with her bachelor's degree, she went to Harvard Medical School where she graduated with honors. She took a year off from Harvard to attend the London School of Economics and the London School of Hygiene and Tropical Medicine, earning her master's of science in health policy, planning and financing. While in London, she was a Fulbright Scholar.

While in medical school, she interned with the Vaccine Fund of the Global Alliance for Vaccines and Immunization and conducted a study on immunization in Ghana. She later studied and advised on government relations for health and development in Rwanda in partnership with Partners in Health.

== Career ==
Kerry completed her internal medicine residency and critical care fellowship at the Massachusetts General Hospital in Boston. She is now a physician specializing in critical care. Kerry has continued work in global health and has collaborated on projects in Haiti and Rwanda through the Harvard Medical School Department of Global Health and Social Medicine. She has worked on public sector partnerships in Uganda, Malawi, Zambia and Sierra Leone through Seed Global Health and supports education and public policy at the MGH Center for Global Health. Kerry also serves as director of the Program in Global Public Policy and Social Change and is an associate professor at Harvard Medical School.

=== Seed Global Health ===
Active in global health for many years, in 2011 Kerry started the non-profit Seed Global Health. Seed's flagship program was the Global Health Service Partnership (GHSP), a partnership with the Peace Corps. The Partnership sent health professionals abroad to work as medical and nursing educators and to help build capacity. With the Peace Corps through GHSP, Seed helped send over 191 physician and nurse educators to train more than 16,000 health professionals in sub-Saharan Africa. In 2018, Seed launched a new strategy, Sharing Knowledge, Saving Lives. The program is currently active in Malawi, Uganda, Sierra-Leone, and Zambia and has trained almost 40,000 health workers in seven countries in Sub-Saharan Africa in total.

In 2010, Kerry wrote an op-ed on the idea of sending American health professionals to teach for The New York Times. She has also published in the New England Journal of Medicine and The Lancet on the topic. The program also partners with academic medical centers such as the Massachusetts General Hospital and the MGH Center for Global Health. In 2013, Kerry, as CEO was named a Draper Richards Kaplan Social Entrepreneur. In 2014, she was featured in Boston Magazine's Power of Ideas for her work with the organization. In 2015, she earned an Honorary Doctor of Public Service degree from Northeastern University. In 2016, she was named a World Economic Forum Young Global Leader.

Seed's work has promoted the need for a strong workforce and health systems for better health, economic growth, security and wellbeing. In 2021, Seed started promoting the connection between and health and climate change at the Conference of the parties 26.

Kerry is the Director of the Program in Global Public Policy at the Mass General Center for Global Health and spearheads the program in Global Public Policy and Social Change at the Department of Global Health and Social Medicine. She is an Associate Professor of Medicine at Harvard Medical School and serves on its faculty.

=== World Health Organization ===
In June 2023, Kerry was appointed as the first Special Envoy for Climate Change and Health at the World Health Organization (WHO). At WHO, Kerry's responsibilities include raising awareness of the impact of climate change on health, helping to mobilize resources to advance the work of WHO, and to advance high-level advocacy.

== Personal life ==
On October 10, 2009 in Boston, Kerry married neurosurgeon Brian Vala Nahed, who specializes in brain tumors and spinal disorders. As a surgeon and scientist, Nahed leads a research lab, which aims to develop the first blood test for brain tumors. They have a son born in 2012 and a daughter born in 2015.

=== Advocacy ===
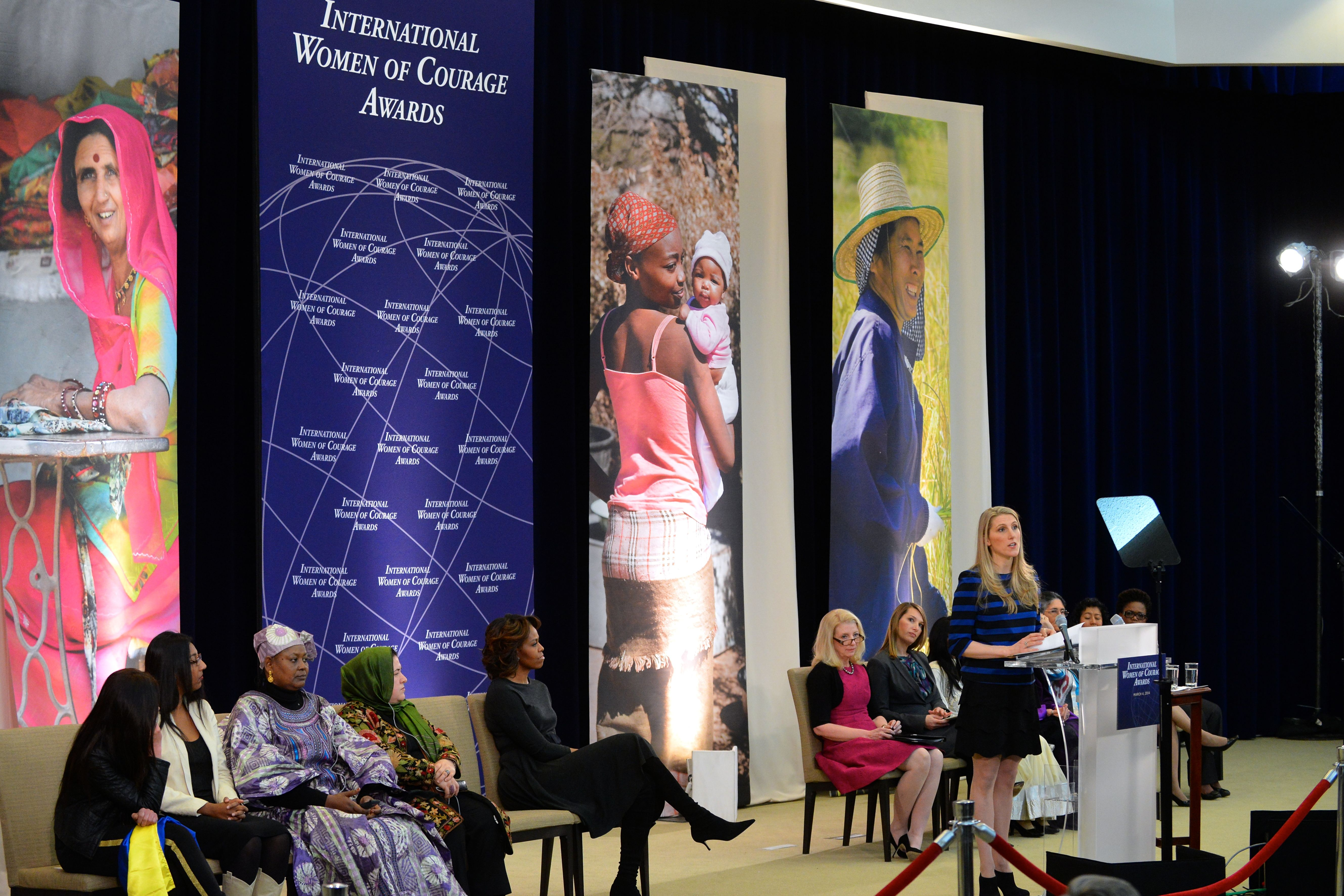
Dr. Kerry delivers remarks at the International Women of Courage Award Ceremony at the U.S. Department of State in Washington, D.C., on March 4, 2014

Kerry took a leave from her medical studies in order to campaign for her father's, then Senator John Kerry, presidential bid in 2004, even introducing him at that year's Democratic National Convention. She campaigned by herself and with her sister, mostly focusing on campaign stops at university campuses. She made speeches in support of her father and focused on health care issues and tuition costs for students, two Democratic campaign issues she felt personally attached to. She also appeared with Alexandra on the MTV Music Video Awards show in Miami where she joined George W. Bush's daughters Barbara and Jenna, who were campaigning for their father George W. Bush, to encourage youth and citizen voting. Jenna later confirmed that Barbara and Jenna also developed a friendship with John Kerry's daughters, Alexandra and Vanessa. Through her work with her father and her public health policy education, she has not ruled out running for political office in the future.

She has also spoken at a number of venues around the globe including World Health Assembly, United Nations, Aspen Ideas Festival, Millennium Campus Network Conferences, TedX Boston, San Diego State University, UCLA, APHA and other venues.
