= John Kerry =

American politician and diplomat (born 1943)

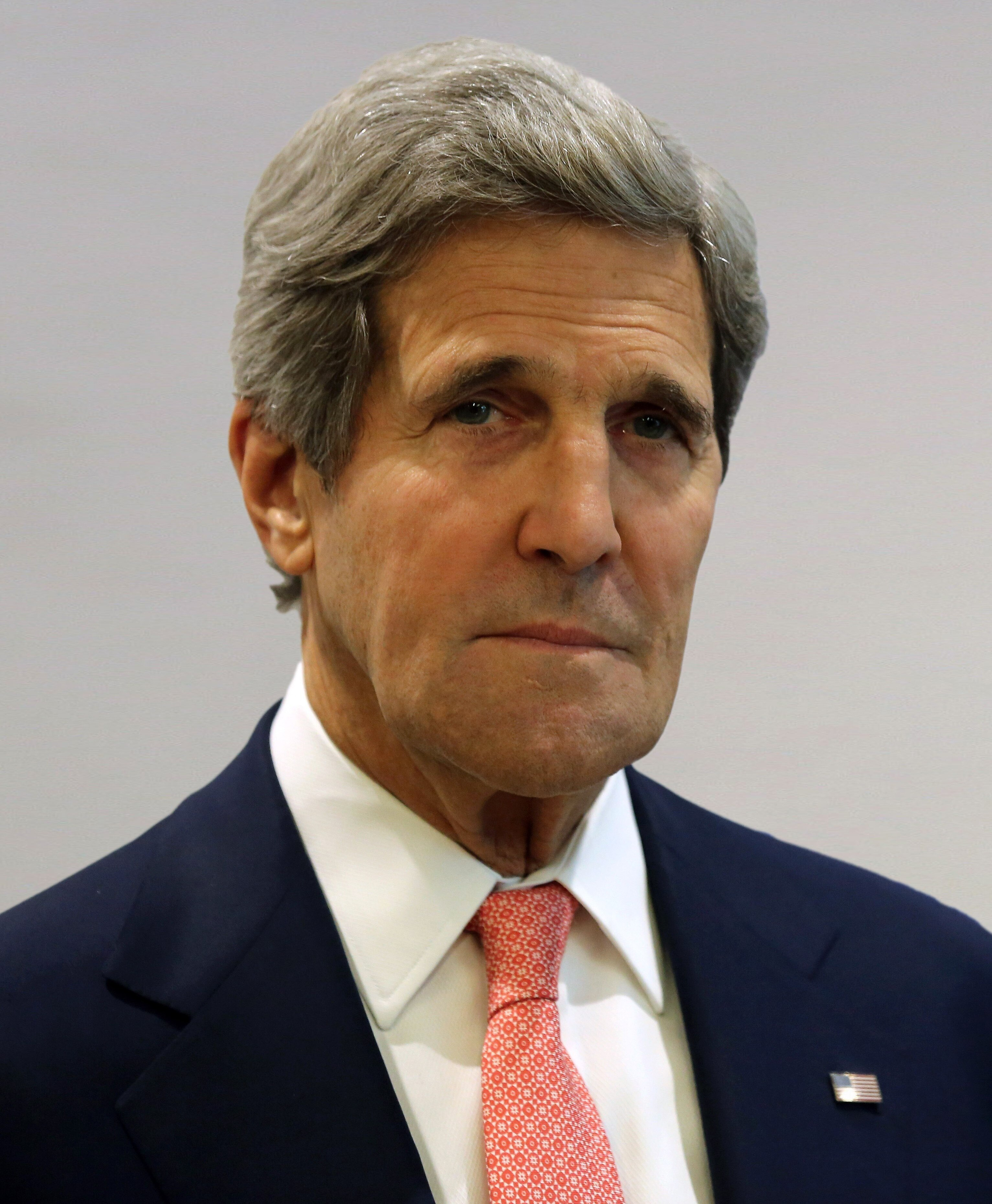
- Official portrait, 2021

68th United States Secretary of State
- In office February 1, 2013 – January 20, 2017
- President: Barack Obama
- Deputy: Bill Burns; Wendy Sherman (acting); Antony Blinken
- Preceded by: Hillary Clinton
- Succeeded by: Rex Tillerson

United States Special Presidential Envoy for Climate
- In office January 20, 2021 – March 6, 2024
- President: Joe Biden
- Preceded by: Office established
- Succeeded by: John Podesta (Senior Advisor)

United States Senator from Massachusetts
- In office January 2, 1985 – February 1, 2013
- Preceded by: Paul Tsongas
- Succeeded by: Mo Cowan
Senate positions
Chair of the Senate Foreign Relations Committee
In office January 6, 2009 – February 1, 2013
Preceded by	Joe Biden
Succeeded by	Bob Menendez
Chair of the Senate Small Business Committee
In office January 3, 2007 – January 3, 2009
Preceded by	Olympia Snowe
Succeeded by	Mary Landrieu
In office June 6, 2001 – January 3, 2003
Preceded by	Kit Bond
Succeeded by	Olympia Snowe
Chair of the Democratic Senatorial Campaign Committee
In office January 3, 1987 – January 3, 1989
Leader	Robert Byrd
Preceded by	George J. Mitchell
Succeeded by	John Breaux

66th Lieutenant Governor of Massachusetts
- In office January 6, 1983 – January 2, 1985
- Governor: Michael Dukakis
- Preceded by: Thomas P. O'Neill III
- Succeeded by: Evelyn Murphy

Personal details
- Born: John Forbes Kerry; December 11, 1943 (age 82) Aurora, Colorado, U.S.
- Party: Democratic
- Spouses: Julia Thorne (m. 1970; div. 1988); Teresa Heinz (m. 1995)
- Children: Alexandra; Vanessa
- Parent(s): Richard Kerry; Rosemary Forbes
- Relatives: Forbes family
- Education: Yale University (BA); Boston College (JD)
- Civilian awards: Presidential Medal of Freedom (2024)

Military service
- Allegiance: United States
- Branch/service: United States Navy
- Years of service: 1966–1978
- Rank: Lieutenant
- Unit: USS Gridley (DLG-21); Coastal Squadron 1
- Commands: PCF-44; PCF-94
- Battles/wars: Vietnam War (WIA); Operation Sealords
- Military awards: Silver Star; Bronze Star Medal (with valor); Purple Heart (3); Combat Action Ribbon
- Kerry's voice Kerry on the Ghouta chemical attack Recorded August 26, 2013

John Forbes Kerry (born December 11, 1943) is an American attorney, politician, diplomat, and former naval officer who served as the 68th United States secretary of state from 2013 to 2017 in the administration of President Barack Obama. A member of the Democratic Party, he previously represented Massachusetts in the United States Senate from 1985 to 2013 and later served as the first and only U.S. special presidential envoy for climate from 2021 to 2024. Kerry was the Democratic presidential nominee in the 2004 presidential election.

Born into the prominent Forbes family in Aurora, Colorado, Kerry grew up in Massachusetts and Washington, D.C. In 1966, after graduating from Yale University, he enlisted in the United States Naval Reserve, ultimately attaining the rank of lieutenant. During the Vietnam War, Kerry served a brief tour in South Vietnam. While commanding a Swift Boat, he sustained three wounds in combat with the Viet Cong, for which he earned three Purple Heart medals. Kerry was also awarded the Silver Star Medal and the Bronze Star Medal for conduct in separate military engagements. After completing his active military service, Kerry returned to the United States and became an outspoken opponent of the Vietnam War. He gained national recognition as an anti-war activist, serving as a spokesperson for the Vietnam Veterans Against the War organization. Kerry testified in the Fulbright Hearings before the Senate Committee on Foreign Relations, where he described the United States government's policy in Vietnam as the cause of war crimes.

In 1972, Kerry was an unsuccessful candidate for the U.S. House of Representatives in Massachusetts's 5th congressional district, losing to Republican Paul W. Cronin in the general election. He subsequently worked as a radio talk show host, as the executive director of an advocacy organization while attending law school, and later in private legal practice. In 1982, Kerry was elected lieutenant governor of Massachusetts as the running mate of Michael Dukakis's ticket. In 1984, Kerry was elected to the United States Senate representing Massachusetts. During his career in the Senate, Kerry won the Democratic nomination in the 2004 Democratic Party presidential primaries, but lost the general election to incumbent Republican president George W. Bush.

In January 2013, Kerry was nominated by President Obama and confirmed by the Senate to succeed Hillary Clinton as Secretary of State, serving through the rest of Obama's second term. During his tenure, he initiated the 2013–2014 Israeli–Palestinian peace talks and negotiated agreements restricting the nuclear program of Iran, including the 2013 Joint Plan of Action and the 2015 Joint Comprehensive Plan of Action. In 2015, Kerry signed the Paris Agreement on climate change on behalf of the United States. In January 2021, Kerry returned to government, serving as the U.S. special presidential envoy for climate under President Joe Biden. In March 2024, Kerry left this position to work on Biden's 2024 presidential campaign. Kerry was awarded the Presidential Medal of Freedom by Biden in May 2024.

== Early life and education (1943–1966) ==
John Forbes Kerry was born on December 11, 1943, at the Fitzsimons Army Medical Center in Aurora, Colorado. He is the second of four children born to Richard John Kerry, a U.S. diplomat and lawyer, and Rosemary Forbes, a nurse and social activist. His father was Catholic and his mother was Episcopalian. He was raised with an elder sister Margaret, a younger sister Diana, and a younger brother Cameron. The children were raised in their father's Catholic faith, and John served as an altar boy.

Kerry was originally considered a military brat, until his father was discharged from the United States Army Air Corps in 1944. Kerry lived in Groton, Massachusetts his first year and Millis, Massachusetts afterwards before moving to the Georgetown neighborhood of Washington, D.C. at age seven, when his father took a position in the Department of the Navy's Office of General Counsel and soon became a diplomat in the State Department's Bureau of United Nations Affairs.

As members of the Forbes family, his maternal extended family enjoyed great wealth. Kerry's parents themselves were considered upper-middle class. They turned to his wealthy grand-aunt, Clara Winthrop, who paid for his attendance at elite boarding schools, such as Institut Montana Zugerberg, in Zug, Switzerland. Through his maternal ancestry, Kerry also descends from Rev. James McGregor, who was among the first 500 Scots-Irish immigrants to Boston Harbor in the 18th century.

When Kerry was ten years old, his father took a position as the U.S. Attorney for Berlin. When Kerry was twelve, he crossed into the Soviet Occupation Zone to visit Hitler's bunker and ride through the Brandenburg Gate.

In 1957, his father was stationed at the U.S. Embassy in Oslo, Norway, and Kerry was sent back to the United States to attend boarding school. He first attended Fessenden School in Newton, Massachusetts, and later St. Paul's School in Concord, New Hampshire, where he learned skills in public speaking and began developing an interest in politics. Kerry founded the John Winant Society at St. Paul's to debate the issues of the day; the Society still exists there. In 1960, while at St. Paul's, he played bass in a minor rock band called The Electras with six of his classmates. The band had about five hundred copies of one album printed in 1961, which they sold some of at dances at the school; it was made available on streaming platforms many years later.

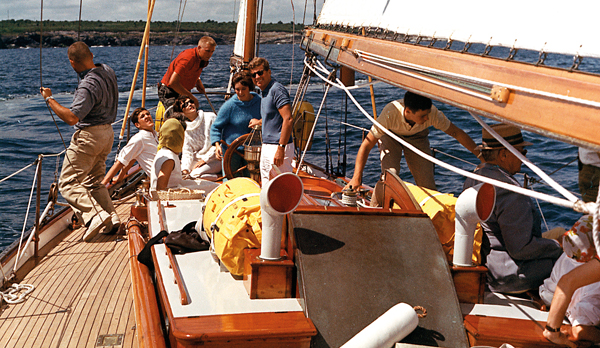
John Kerry, in the upper left in white, aboard the yacht of President John F. Kennedy, in August 1962

In 1962, Kerry attended Yale University, majoring in political science and residing in Jonathan Edwards College. By that year, his parents had returned to Groton. While at Yale, Kerry briefly dated Janet Auchincloss, the younger half-sister of First Lady Jacqueline Kennedy. Through Auchincloss, Kerry was invited to a day of sailing with then-President John F. Kennedy and his family.

Kerry played on the varsity Yale Bulldogs men's soccer team, earning his only letter in his senior year. He also played freshman and junior varsity hockey and, in his senior year, junior varsity lacrosse. In addition, he was a member of the Psi Upsilon fraternity and took flying lessons.

In his second year, Kerry became the chairman of the Liberal Party of the Yale Political Union, and a year later he served as president of the union. Amongst his influential teachers in this period was Professor H. Bradford Westerfield, who was himself a former president of the Political Union. His involvement with the Political Union gave him an opportunity to be involved with important issues of the day, such as the civil rights movement and the New Frontier program. He also became a member of the Skull and Bones Society, and traveled to Switzerland through AIESEC Yale.

Under the guidance of the speaking coach and history professor Rollin G. Osterweis, Kerry won many debates against other college students from across the nation. In March 1965, as the Vietnam War escalated, he won the Ten Eyck prize as the best orator in the junior class for a speech that was critical of U.S. foreign policy. In the speech he said, "It is the spectre of Western imperialism that causes more fear among Africans and Asians than communism and thus, it is self-defeating."

Kerry graduated from Yale with a bachelor of arts degree in 1966. Overall, he had below-average grades, graduating with a cumulative average of 76 over his four years. His freshman-year average was a 71, but he improved to an 81 average for his senior year. He never received an "A" during his time at Yale; his highest grade was an 89.

== Military service (1966–1970) ==
=== Duty on USS Gridley ===
On February 18, 1966, Kerry enlisted in the Naval Reserve. He began his active duty military service on August 19, 1966. After completing 16 weeks of Officer Candidate School at the U.S. Naval Training Center in Newport, Rhode Island, Kerry received his officer's commission on December 16, 1966. During the 2004 election, Kerry posted his military records on his website, and permitted reporters to inspect his medical records. In 2005, Kerry released his military and medical records to the representatives of three news organizations, but has not authorized full public access to those records.

During his tour on the guided missile frigate USS Gridley, Kerry requested duty in South Vietnam, listing as his first preference a position as the commander of a Fast Patrol Craft (PCF), also known as a "Swift Boat". These 50-foot (15 m) boats have aluminum hulls and little or no armor, but are heavily armed and rely on speed. "I didn't really want to get involved in the war," Kerry said in a book of Vietnam reminiscences published in 1986. "When I signed up for the swift boats, they had very little to do with the war. They were engaged in coastal patrolling and that's what I thought I was going to be doing." However, his second choice of billet was on a river patrol boat, or "PBR", which at the time was serving a more dangerous duty on the rivers of Vietnam.

=== Military honors ===
During the night of December 2 and early morning of December 3, 1968, Kerry was in charge of a small boat operating near a peninsula north of Cam Ranh Bay together with a Swift Boat (PCF-60). According to Kerry and the two crewmen who accompanied him that night, Patrick Runyon and William Zaladonis, they surprised a group of Vietnamese men unloading sampans at a river crossing, who began running and failed to obey an order to stop. As the men fled, Kerry and his crew opened fire on the sampans and destroyed them, then rapidly left. During this encounter, Kerry received a shrapnel wound in the left arm above the elbow. It was for this injury that Kerry received his first Purple Heart Medal.

Kerry received his second Purple Heart for a wound received in action on the Bồ Đề River on February 20, 1969. The plan had been for the Swift Boats to be accompanied by support helicopters. On the way up the Bo De, however, the helicopters were attacked. As the Swift Boats reached the Cửa Lớn River, Kerry's boat was hit by a B-40 rocket (rocket propelled grenade round), and a piece of shrapnel hit Kerry's left leg, wounding him. Thereafter, enemy fire ceased and his boat reached the Gulf of Thailand safely. Kerry continues to have shrapnel embedded in his left thigh because the doctors who first treated him decided to remove the damaged tissue and close the wound with sutures rather than make a wide opening to remove the shrapnel. Although wounded like several others earlier that day, Kerry did not lose any time off from duty.

==== Silver Star ====
Eight days later, on February 28, 1969, came the events for which Kerry was awarded his Silver Star Medal. On this occasion, Kerry was in tactical command of his Swift Boat and two other Swift Boats during a combat operation. Their mission on the Duong Keo River included bringing an underwater demolition team and dozens of South Vietnamese Marines to destroy enemy sampans, structures and bunkers as described in the story The Death Of PCF 43. Running into heavy small arms fire from the river banks, Kerry "directed the units to turn to the beach and charge the Viet Cong positions" and he "expertly directed" his boat's fire causing the enemy to flee while at the same time coordinating the insertion of the 90 South Vietnamese troops (according to the original medal citation signed by Admiral Elmo Zumwalt). Moving a short distance upstream, Kerry's boat was the target of a B-40 rocket round; Kerry charged the enemy positions and as his boat hove to and beached, a Viet Cong ("VC") insurgent armed with a rocket launcher emerged from a spider hole and ran. While the boat's gunner opened fire, wounding the VC in the leg, and the other boats approached and offered cover fire, Kerry jumped from the boat to pursue the VC insurgent, subsequently killing him and capturing his loaded rocket launcher.

Kerry's commanding officer, Lieutenant Commander George Elliott, stated to Douglas Brinkley in 2003 that he did not know whether to court-martial Kerry for beaching the boat without orders or give him a medal for saving the crew. Elliott recommended Kerry for the Silver Star, and Zumwalt flew into An Thoi to personally award medals to Kerry and the rest of the sailors involved in the mission. The Navy's account of Kerry's actions is presented in the original medal citation signed by Zumwalt. The engagement was documented in an after-action report, a press release written on March 1, 1969, and a historical summary dated March 17, 1969.

==== Bronze Star ====
On March 13, 1969, on the Bái Háp River, Kerry was in charge of one of five Swift Boats returning to their base after performing an Operation Sealords mission to transport South Vietnamese troops from the garrison at Cái Nước and MIKE Force advisors for a raid on a Vietcong camp located on the Rach Dong Cung canal. Earlier in the day, Kerry received a slight shrapnel wound in the buttocks from blowing up a rice bunker. Debarking some but not all of the passengers at a small village, the boats approached a fishing weir; one group of boats went around to the left of the weir, hugging the shore, and a group with Kerry's PCF-94 boat went around to the right, along the shoreline. A mine was detonated directly beneath the lead boat, PCF-3, as it crossed the weir to the left, lifting PCF-3 "about 2–3 ft out of water".

James Rassmann, a Green Beret advisor who was aboard Kerry's PCF-94, was knocked overboard when, according to witnesses and the documentation of the event, a mine or rocket exploded close to the boat. According to the documentation for the event, Kerry's arm was injured when he was thrown against a bulkhead during the explosion. PCF 94 returned to the scene and Kerry rescued Rassmann who was receiving sniper fire from the water. Kerry received the Bronze Star Medal with Combat "V" for "heroic achievement", for his actions during this incident; he also received his third Purple Heart.

=== Return from Vietnam ===
After Kerry's third qualifying wound, he was entitled per Navy regulations to reassignment away from combat duties. Kerry's preferred choice for reassignment was as a military aide in Boston, New York City or Washington, D.C. On April 11, 1969, he reported to the Brooklyn-based Atlantic Military Sea Transportation Service, where he would remain on active duty for the following year as a personal aide to an officer, Rear Admiral Walter Schlech. On January 1, 1970, Kerry was temporarily promoted to full lieutenant. Kerry had agreed to an extension of his active duty obligation from December 1969 to August 1970 in order to perform Swift Boat duty. John Kerry was on active duty in the United States Navy from August 1966 until January 1970. He continued to serve in the Naval Reserve until February 1978.

=== "Swiftboating" controversy ===
With the continuing controversy that had surrounded the military service of George W. Bush since the 2000 presidential election (when he was accused of having used his father's political influence to gain entrance to the Texas Air National Guard, thereby protecting himself from conscription into the United States Army, and possible service in the Vietnam War), John Kerry's contrasting status as a decorated Vietnam War veteran posed a problem for Bush's re-election campaign, which Republicans sought to counter by calling Kerry's war record into question. As the presidential campaign of 2004 developed, approximately 250 members of a group called Swift Boat Veterans for Truth (SBVT, later renamed Swift Vets and POWs for Truth) opposed Kerry's campaign. The group held press conferences, ran ads and endorsed a book questioning Kerry's service record and military awards. The group included several members of Kerry's unit, such as Larry Thurlow, who commanded a Swift Boat alongside Kerry, and Stephen Gardner, who served on Kerry's boat. The campaign inspired the widely used political pejorative '"swiftboating", to describe an unfair or untrue political attack. Most of Kerry's former crewmates have stated that SBVT's allegations are false.

== Anti-war activism (1970–1971) ==
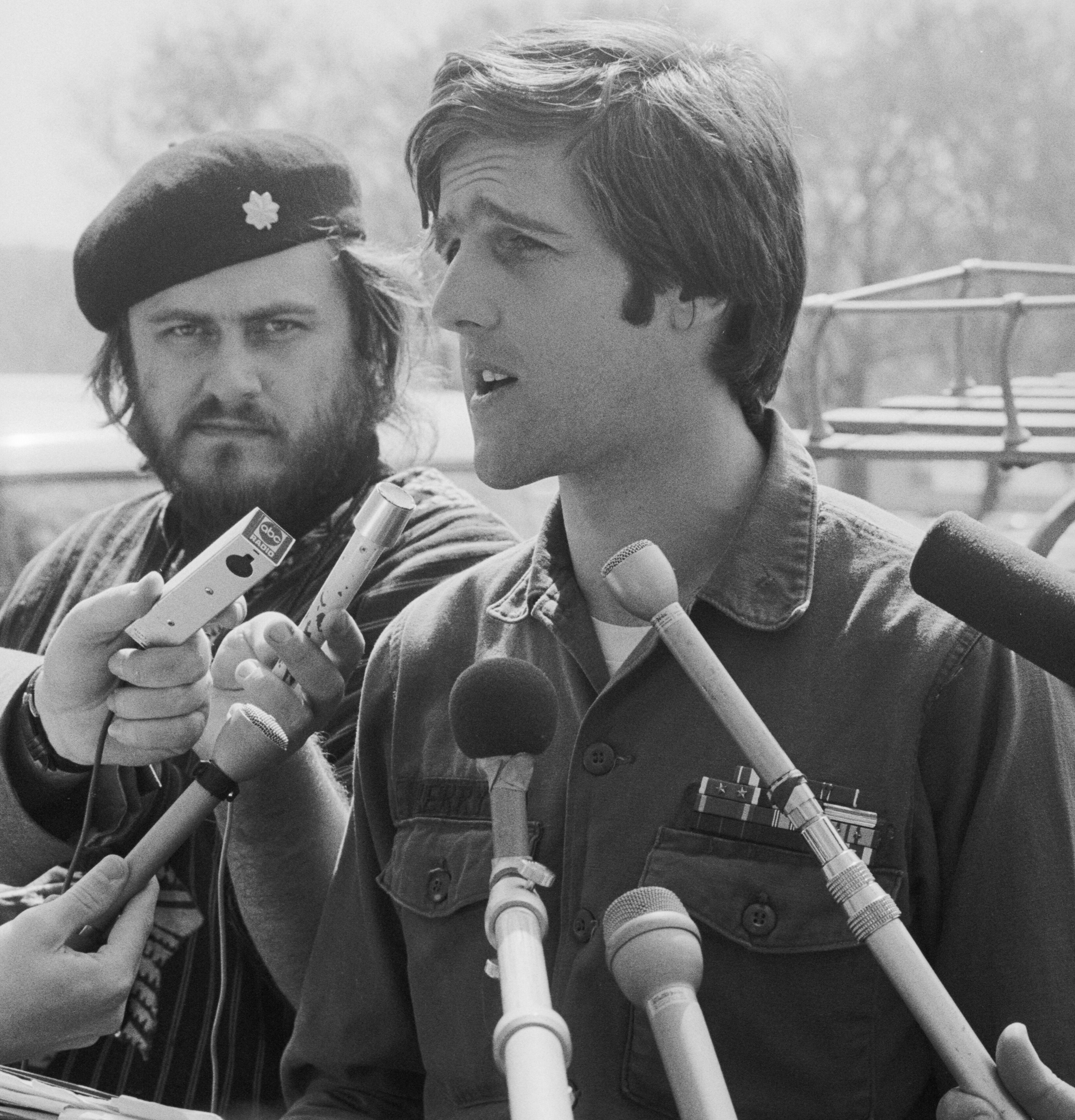
John Kerry speaking as a VVAW spokesman on April 21, 1971

After returning to the United States, Kerry moved to Waltham, Massachusetts and joined the Vietnam Veterans Against the War (VVAW). Then numbering about 20,000, VVAW was considered by some (including the administration of President Richard Nixon) to be an effective, if controversial, component of the antiwar movement. Kerry participated in the "Winter Soldier Investigation" conducted by VVAW of U.S. atrocities in Vietnam, and he appears in a film by that name that documents the investigation. According to Nixon's Secretary of Defense Melvin Laird, "I didn't approve of what he did, but I understood the protesters quite well", and he declined two requests from the Navy to court martial Reserve Lieutenant Kerry over his antiwar activity.

On April 22, 1971, Kerry appeared before a U.S. Senate committee hearing on proposals relating to ending the war. The day after this testimony, Kerry participated in a demonstration with thousands of other veterans in which he and other Vietnam War veterans threw their medals and service ribbons over a fence erected at the front steps of the United States Capitol building to dramatize their opposition to the war. Jack Smith, a Marine, read a statement explaining why the veterans were returning their military awards to the government. For more than two hours, almost 1,000 angry veterans tossed their medals, ribbons, hats, jackets, and military papers over the fence. Each veteran gave his or her name, hometown, branch of service and a statement. Kerry threw some of his own decorations and awards as well as some given to him by other veterans to throw. As Kerry threw his decorations over the fence, his statement was: "I'm not doing this for any violent reasons, but for peace and justice, and to try and make this country wake up once and for all."

Kerry was arrested on May 30, 1971, during a VVAW march to honor American POWs held captive by North Vietnam. The march was planned as a multi-day event from Concord to Boston, and while in Lexington, participants tried to camp on the village green. At 2:30 a.m., local and state police arrested 441 demonstrators, including Kerry, for trespassing. All were given the Miranda Warning and were hauled away on school buses to spend the night at the Lexington Public Works Garage. Kerry and the other protesters later paid a $5 fine, and were released. The mass arrests caused a community backlash and ended up giving positive coverage to the VVAW.

== Early political career (1972–1985) ==
=== 1972 congressional election ===
In 1970, Kerry had considered running for Congress in the Democratic primary against hawkish Democrat Philip J. Philbin of Massachusetts's 3rd congressional district, but deferred in favor of Robert Drinan, a Jesuit priest and anti-war activist, who went on to defeat Philbin. In February 1972, Kerry's wife bought a house in Worcester, with Kerry intending to run against the 4th district's aging thirteen-term incumbent Democrat, Harold Donohue. The couple never moved in. After Republican Congressman F. Bradford Morse of the neighboring 5th district announced his retirement and then resignation to become Under-Secretary-General for Political and General Assembly Affairs at the United Nations, the couple instead rented an apartment in Lowell so Kerry could run to succeed him.

Including Kerry, the Democratic primary race had 10 candidates, including attorney Paul J. Sheehy, State Representative Anthony R. DiFruscia, John J. Desmond and Robert B. Kennedy. Kerry ran a "very expensive, sophisticated campaign", financed by out-of-state backers and supported by many young volunteers. DiFruscia's campaign headquarters shared the same building as Kerry's. On the eve of the September 19 primary, police found Kerry's younger brother Cameron and campaign field director Thomas J. Vallely, breaking into where the building's telephone lines were located. They were arrested and charged with "breaking and entering with the intent to commit grand larceny", but the charges were dropped a year later. DiFruscia alleged the two were trying to disrupt his get-out-the vote efforts. Vallely and Cameron Kerry maintained they were only checking their own telephone lines because they had received an anonymous call warning that the Kerry lines would be cut.

Despite the arrests, Kerry won the primary with 20,771 votes (27.56%). Sheehy came second with 15,641 votes (20.75%), followed by DiFruscia with 12,222 votes (16.22%), Desmond with 10,213 votes (13.55%) and Kennedy with 5,632 votes (7.47%). The remaining 10,891 votes were split amongst the other five candidates, with 1970 nominee Richard Williams coming last with just 1,706 votes (2.26%).

In the general election, Kerry was initially favored to defeat the Republican candidate, former State Representative Paul W. Cronin, and conservative Democrat Roger P. Durkin, who ran as an independent. A week after the primary, one poll put Kerry 26-points ahead of Cronin. His campaign called for a national health insurance system, discounted prescription drugs for the unemployed, a jobs program to clean up the Merrimack River and rent controls in Lowell and Lawrence. A major obstacle, however, was the district's leading newspaper, the conservative daily The Sun. The paper editorialized against him. It also ran critical news stories about his out-of-state contributions and his "carpetbagging", because he had only moved into the district in April. Subsequently released "Watergate" Oval Office tape recordings of the Nixon White House showed defeating Kerry's candidacy had attracted the personal attention of President Nixon. Kerry himself asserts Nixon sent operatives to Lowell to help derail his campaign.

The race was the most expensive for Congress in the country that year, and four days before the general election, Durkin withdrew and endorsed Cronin, hoping to see Kerry defeated. The week before, a poll had put Kerry 10 points ahead of Cronin, with Durkin at 13%. In the final days of the campaign, Kerry sensed it was "slipping away", and Cronin emerged victorious by 110,970 votes (53.45%) to Kerry's 92,847 (44.72%). After his defeat, Kerry lamented in a letter to supporters that "for two solid weeks, The Sun called me un-American, New Left antiwar agitator, unpatriotic, and labeled me every other 'un-' and 'anti-' that they could find. It's hard to believe that one newspaper could be so powerful, but they were." He later felt his failure to respond directly to The Sun's attacks cost him the race.

=== Law career ===
After Kerry's 1972 defeat, he and his wife bought a house in the Belvidere section of Lowell, Massachusetts, entering a decade which his brother Cameron later called "the years in exile". He spent some time working as a fundraiser for the Cooperative for Assistance and Relief Everywhere (CARE), an international humanitarian organization. In September 1973, he entered Boston College Law School. While studying, Kerry worked as a talk radio host on WBZ and, in July 1974, was named executive director of Mass Action, a Massachusetts advocacy association.

Kerry received his juris doctor (J.D.) from Boston College in 1976. While in law school he was a student prosecutor in the office of the District Attorney of Middlesex County, John J. Droney. After passing the bar exam and being admitted to the Massachusetts bar in 1976, he went to work in that office as a full-time prosecutor and moved to Chestnut Hill, Massachusetts.

In January 1977, Droney promoted him to First Assistant District Attorney, essentially making Kerry his campaign and media surrogate because Droney was afflicted with amyotrophic lateral sclerosis (ALS, or Lou Gehrig's Disease). As First Assistant, Kerry tried cases, which included winning convictions in a high-profile rape case and a murder. He also played a role in administering the office, including initiating the creation of special white-collar and organized crime units, creating programs to address the problems of rape and other crime victims and witnesses, and managing trial calendars to reflect case priorities. In 1978, Kerry launched a criminal investigation against Senator Edward Brooke, regarding "misstatements" in his first divorce trial. The inquiry ended with no charges being brought after investigators and prosecutors determined Brooke's misstatements were pertinent to the case, but were not material enough to have affected the outcome.

Droney's health was poor and Kerry had decided to run for his position in the 1978 election should Droney drop out. However, Droney was re-elected and his health improved; he went on to re-assume many of the duties that he had delegated to Kerry. Kerry thus decided to leave, departing in 1979 with assistant DA Roanne Sragow to set up their own law firm. Kerry also worked as a commentator for WCVB-TV and co-founded a bakery, Kilvert & Forbes Ltd., with businessman and former Kennedy aide K. Dun Gifford.

=== Lieutenant Governor of Massachusetts ===
In the 1982 Massachusetts gubernatorial election, Lieutenant Governor Thomas P. O'Neill III declined to seek a third term, instead deciding to run for governor of Massachusetts. Kerry declared his candidacy, entering the primary election alongside Massachusetts Secretary of Environmental Affairs Evelyn Murphy, State Senator Samuel Rotondi, State Representative Lou Nickinello, and Lois Pines.

Kerry won the nomination with 325,890 votes (29%) to Murphy's 286,378 (25.48%), Rotondi's 228,086 (20.29%), Nickinello's 150,829 (13.42%) and Pines' 132,734 (11.81%). In the concurrent gubernatorial primary, former Governor Michael Dukakis defeated O'Neill and incumbent Governor Edward J. King. The Dukakis and Kerry ticket defeated the Republican ticket of John W. Sears and Leon Lombardi in the general election by 1,219,109 votes (61.92%) to 749,679 (38.08%).

As Lieutenant Governor, Kerry led meetings of the Massachusetts Governor's Council. Dukakis also delegated other tasks to Kerry, including serving as the state's liaison to the Federal government of the United States. He was also active on environmental issues, including combating acid rain.

=== 1984 U.S. Senate election ===
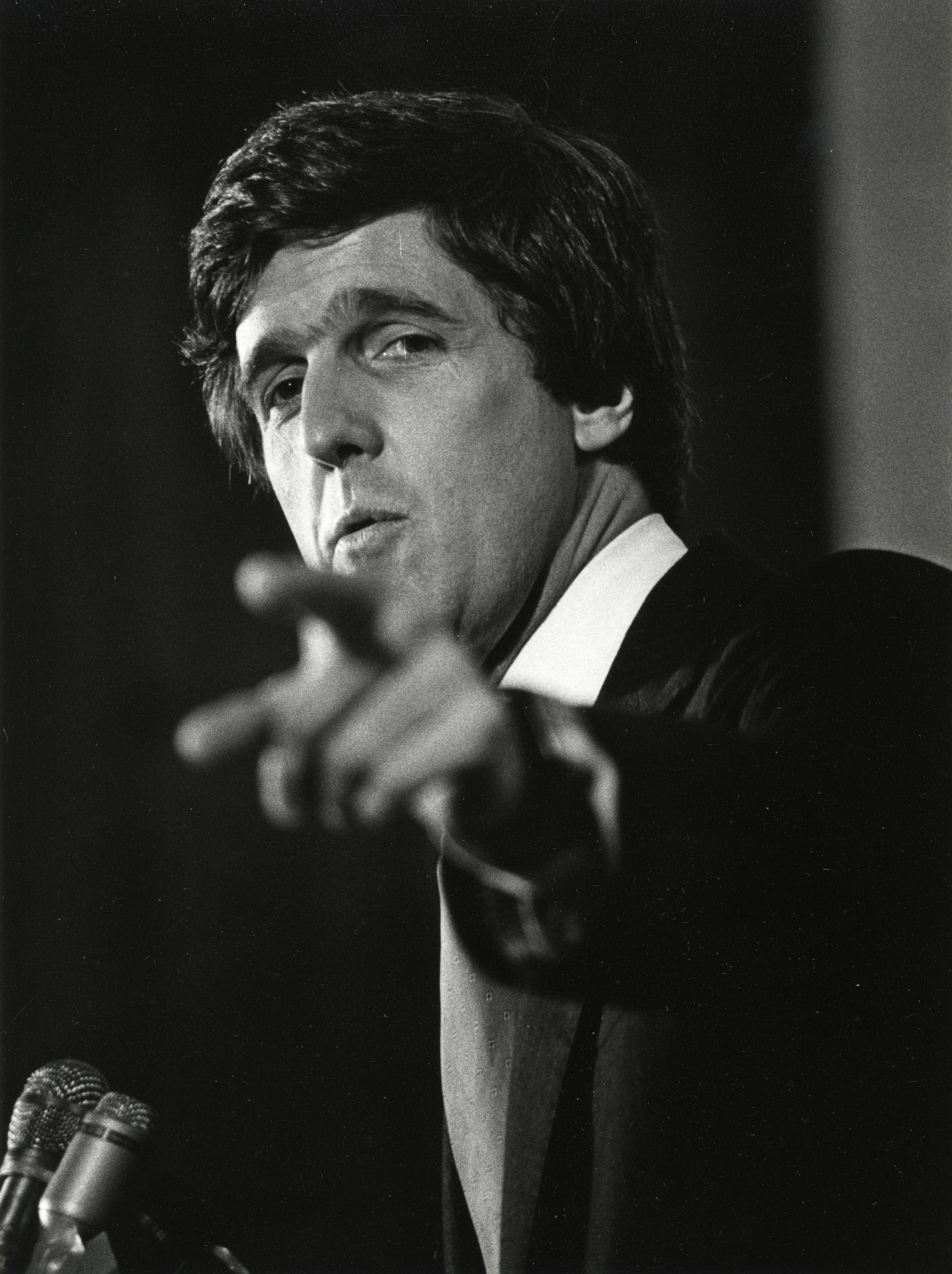
Kerry during his 1984 campaign

The junior U.S. senator from Massachusetts, Paul Tsongas, announced in 1984 that he would be stepping down for health reasons. Kerry ran, and as in his 1982 race for Lieutenant Governor, he did not receive the endorsement of the party regulars at the state Democratic convention. Congressman James Shannon, a favorite of House Speaker Tip O'Neill, was the early favorite to win the nomination, and he "won broad establishment support and led in early polling". Again as in 1982, however, Kerry prevailed in a close primary.

In his general election campaign, Kerry promised to mix liberalism with tight budget controls. He defeated Republican Ray Shamie despite a nationwide landslide for the re-election of Republican president Ronald Reagan, for whom Massachusetts voted by a narrow margin. In his victory speech, Kerry asserted that his win meant the people of Massachusetts "emphatically reject the politics of selfishness and the notion that women must be treated as second-class citizens".

Tsongas resigned on January 2, 1985, one day before the end of his term. Dukakis appointed Kerry to fill the vacancy, giving him seniority over other new senators who were sworn in on January 3, the scheduled start of their new terms.

== U.S. Senate (1985–2013) ==
=== Iran–Contra hearings ===
On April 18, 1985, a few months after taking his Senate seat, Kerry and Senator Tom Harkin of Iowa traveled to Nicaragua and met the country's president, Daniel Ortega. Although Ortega had won internationally certified elections, the trip was criticized because Ortega and his leftist Sandinista government had strong ties to Cuba and the USSR and were accused of human rights abuses. The Sandinista government was opposed by the right-wing CIA-backed rebels known as the Contras. While in Nicaragua, Kerry and Harkin talked to people on both sides of the conflict. Through the senators, Ortega offered a cease-fire agreement in exchange for the U.S. dropping support of the Contras. The offer was denounced by the Reagan administration as a "propaganda initiative" designed to influence a House vote on a $14 million Contra aid package, but Kerry said "I am willing ... to take the risk in the effort to put to test the good faith of the Sandinistas." The House voted down the Contra aid, but Ortega flew to Moscow to accept a $200 million loan the next day, which in part prompted the House to pass a larger $27 million aid package six weeks later.

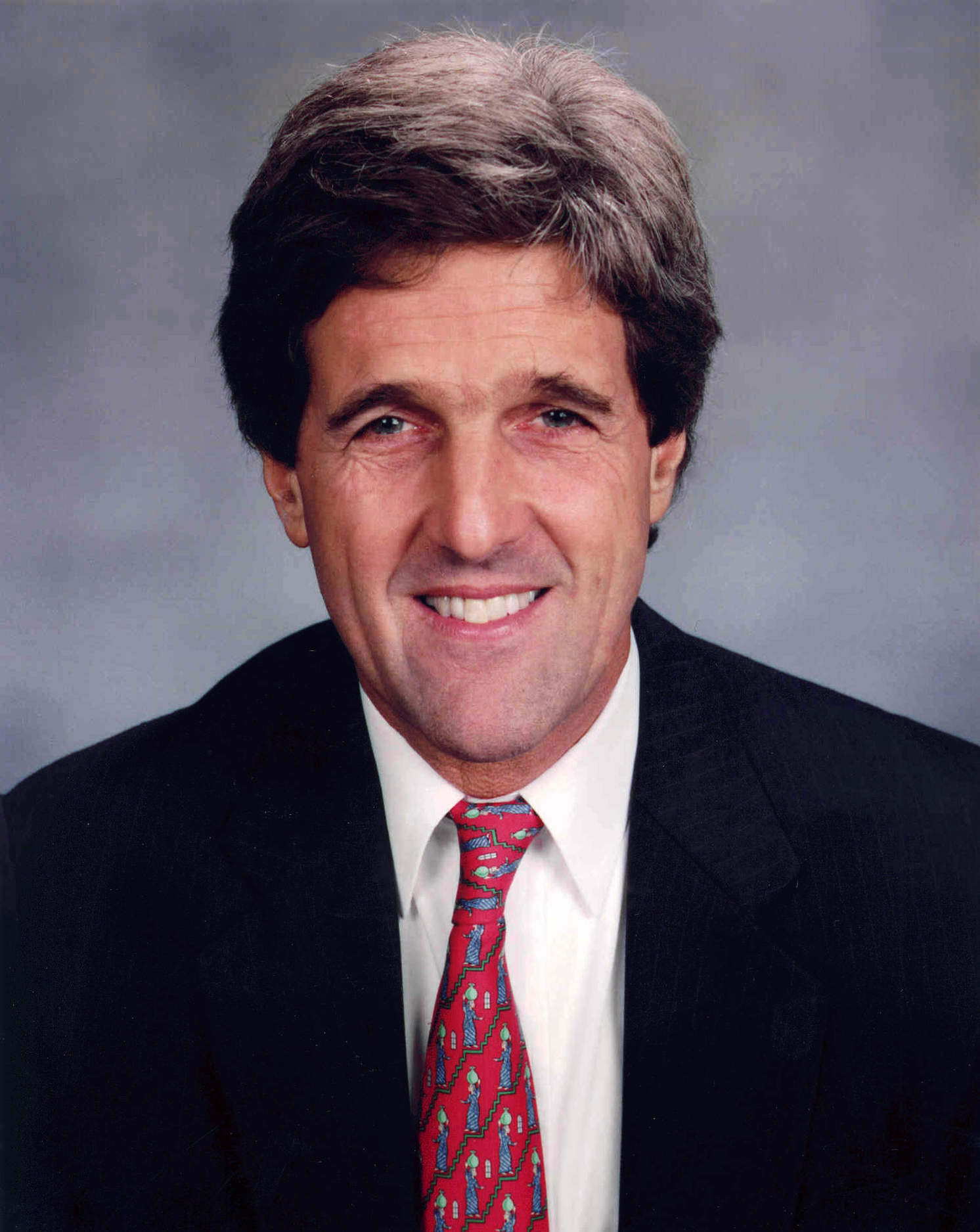
A Senate portrait of Kerry

Meanwhile, Kerry's staff began their own investigations and, on October 14, issued a report that exposed illegal activities on the part of Lieutenant Colonel Oliver North, who had set up a private network involving the National Security Council and the CIA to deliver military equipment to right-wing Nicaraguan rebels (Contras). In effect, North and certain members of the President's administration were accused by Kerry's report of illegally funding and supplying armed militants without the authorization of Congress. Kerry's staff investigation, based on a year-long inquiry and interviews with fifty unnamed sources, is said to raise "serious questions about whether the United States has abided by the law in its handling of the contras over the past three years".

The Kerry Committee report found "the Contra drug links included ... payments to drug traffickers by the U.S. State Department of funds authorized by the Congress for humanitarian assistance to the Contras, in some cases after the traffickers had been indicted by federal law enforcement agencies on drug charges, in others while traffickers were under active investigation by these same agencies." The U.S. State Department paid over $806,000 to known drug traffickers to carry humanitarian assistance to the Contras. Kerry's findings provoked little reaction in the media and official Washington circles.

The Kerry report was a precursor to the Iran–Contra affair. On May 4, 1989, North was convicted of charges relating to the Iran/Contra controversy, including three felonies. On September 16, 1991, however, North's convictions were overturned on appeal.

=== George H. W. Bush administration ===
On November 15, 1988, at a businessmen's breakfast in East Lynn, Massachusetts, Kerry made a joke about then-President-elect George H. W. Bush and his running mate, saying "if Bush is shot, the Secret Service has orders to shoot Dan Quayle." He apologized the following day.

During their investigation of General Manuel Noriega, the de facto ruler of Panama, Kerry's staff found reason to believe the Pakistan-based Bank of Credit and Commerce International (BCCI) had facilitated Noriega's drug trafficking and money laundering. This led to a separate inquiry into BCCI, and as a result, banking regulators shut down BCCI in 1991. In December 1992, Kerry and Senator Hank Brown, a Republican from Colorado, released The BCCI Affair, a report on the BCCI scandal. The report showed the bank was crooked and was working with terrorists, including Abu Nidal. It blasted the Department of Justice, the Department of the Treasury, the Customs Service, the Federal Reserve Bank, as well as influential lobbyists and the CIA.

Kerry was criticized by some Democrats for having pursued his own party members, including former Secretary of Defense Clark Clifford, although Republicans said he should have pressed against some Democrats even harder. The BCCI scandal was later turned over to the Manhattan District Attorney's office.

=== Precursors to presidential bid ===
In 1996, Kerry faced a difficult re-election fight against Governor William Weld, a popular Republican incumbent who was re-elected in 1994 with 71% of the vote. The race was covered nationwide as one of the most closely watched Senate races that year. Kerry and Weld held several debates and negotiated a campaign spending cap of $6.9 million at Kerry's Beacon Hill townhouse. Both candidates spent more than the cap, with each camp accusing the other of being first to break the agreement. During the campaign, Kerry spoke briefly at the 1996 Democratic National Convention. Kerry won re-election with 52 percent to Weld's 45 percent.

In the 2000 presidential election, Kerry found himself close to being chosen as the vice presidential running mate.

A release from the presidential campaign of presumptive Democratic nominee Al Gore listed Kerry on the short list to be selected as the vice-presidential nominee, along with North Carolina Senator John Edwards, Indiana Senator Evan Bayh, Missouri Congressman Richard Gephardt, New Hampshire Governor Jeanne Shaheen and Connecticut Senator Joe Lieberman. Gore ultimately chose Lieberman.

=== "You get stuck in Iraq" controversy ===
On October 30, 2006, Kerry was a headline speaker at a campaign rally being held for Democratic California gubernatorial candidate Phil Angelides at Pasadena City College in Pasadena, California. Speaking to an audience composed mainly of college students, Kerry said, "You know, education, if you make the most of it, you study hard, you do your homework and you make an effort to be smart, you can do well. If you don't, you get stuck in Iraq."

The day after he made the remark, leaders from both sides of the political spectrum criticized Kerry's remarks, which he said were a botched joke. Republicans including President George W. Bush, Senator John McCain and then-Speaker of the House Dennis Hastert, said Kerry's comments were insulting to American military forces fighting in Iraq. Democratic Representative Harold Ford Jr. called on Kerry to apologize.

Kerry initially stated: "I apologize to no one for my criticism of the president and of his broken policy". Kerry also responded to criticism from George W. Bush and Dick Cheney.

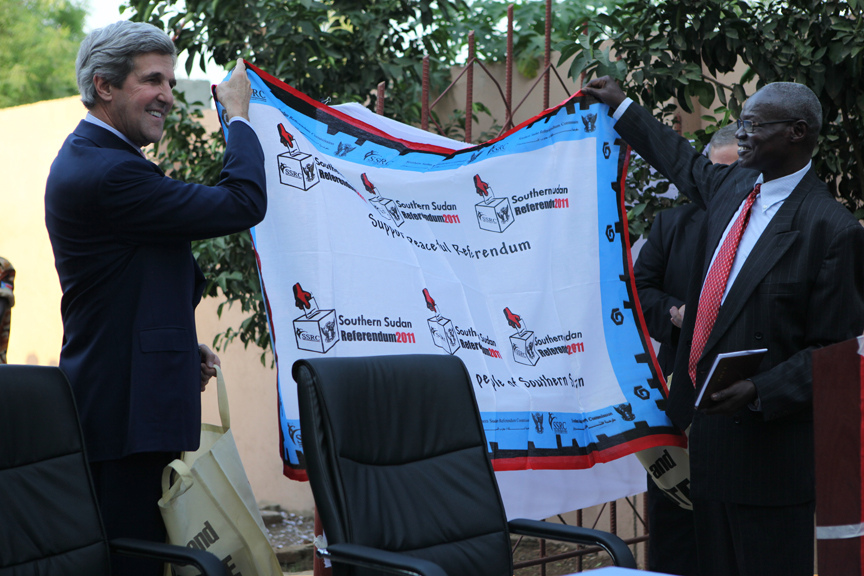
Kerry actively supported an independence referendum in South Sudan, January 2011.

Kerry said he had intended the remark as a jab at President Bush, and described the remarks as a "botched joke", having inadvertently left out the key word "us" (which would have been, "If you don't, you get us stuck in Iraq"), as well as leaving the phrase "just ask President Bush" off of the end of the sentence. In Kerry's prepared remarks, which he released during the ensuing media frenzy, the corresponding line was "... you end up getting us stuck in a war in Iraq. Just ask President Bush". He also said that from the context of the speech which, prior to the "stuck in Iraq" line, made several specific references to Bush and elements of his biography, that Kerry was referring to President Bush and not American troops in general.

After two days of media coverage, citing a desire not to be a diversion, Kerry apologized to those who took offense at what he called the misinterpretation of his comment.

=== First presidential term of Obama ===
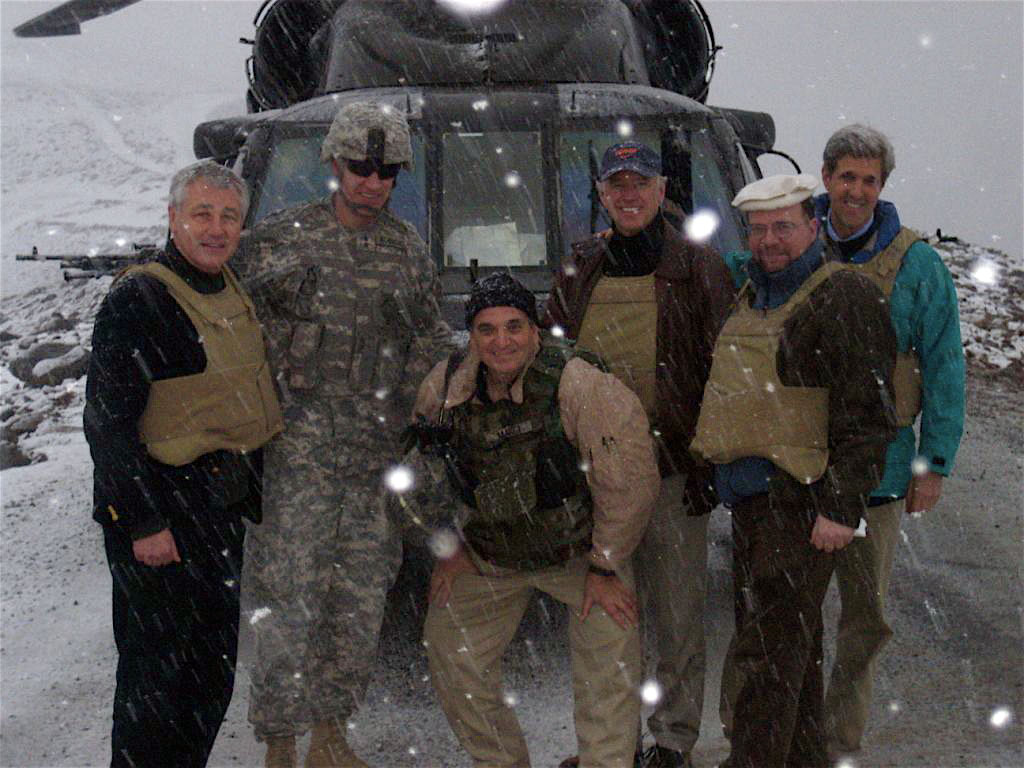
Then-Senators Joe Biden, John Kerry, and Chuck Hagel in Kunar Province, Afghanistan, February 20, 2008

During the first term of the presidency of Barack Obama (a fellow Democrat), Kerry was described as a "go-to guy" for Obama on matters of international affairs.

A Washington Post report in May 2011 stated that Kerry "has emerged in the past few years as an important envoy for Afghanistan and Pakistan during times of crisis", as he undertook another trip to the two countries. The killing of Osama bin Laden "has generated perhaps the most important crossroads yet", the report continued, as the senator spoke at a press conference and prepared to fly from Kabul to Pakistan. Among matters discussed during the May visit to Pakistan, under the general rubric of "recalibrating" the bilateral relationship, Kerry sought and retrieved from the Pakistanis the tail-section of the U.S. helicopter which had had to be abandoned at Abbottabad during the bin Laden strike. In 2013, Kerry met with Pakistan's army chief Gen. Ashfaq Parvez Kayani to discuss the peace process with the Taliban in Afghanistan.

=== Voting record ===
==== Overall ====
Most analyses place Kerry's voting record on the left within the Senate Democratic caucus. During the 2004 presidential election he was portrayed as a staunch liberal by conservative groups and the Bush campaign, who often noted that in 2003 Kerry was rated the top Senate liberal by National Journal. However, that rating was based only upon voting on legislation within that past year. In fact, in terms of career voting records, the National Journal found Kerry was the 11th most liberal member of the Senate. Most analyses find Kerry was at least slightly more liberal than the typical Democratic Senator. Kerry has stated he opposes privatizing Social Security, supports abortion rights for adult women and minors, supports same-sex marriage, opposes capital punishment except for terrorists, supports most gun control laws, and is generally a supporter of trade agreements. In some of these, as in the case of abortion, Kerry distinguishes his personal views as in line with his Catholic faith, but believes separation of church and state demands that he not legislate his religious beliefs upon those who do not share those beliefs. Kerry supported the North American Free Trade Agreement and Most Favored Nation status for China, but opposed the Central American Free Trade Agreement.

In July 1997, Kerry joined his Senate colleagues in voting against the ratification of the Kyoto Treaty on global warming without greenhouse gas emissions limits on nations deemed developing, including India and China. Since then, Kerry has attacked President Bush, charging him with opposition to international efforts to combat global warming.

On October 1, 2008, Kerry voted for the Emergency Economic Stabilization Act of 2008, also known as the TARP bailout.

==== Iraq ====
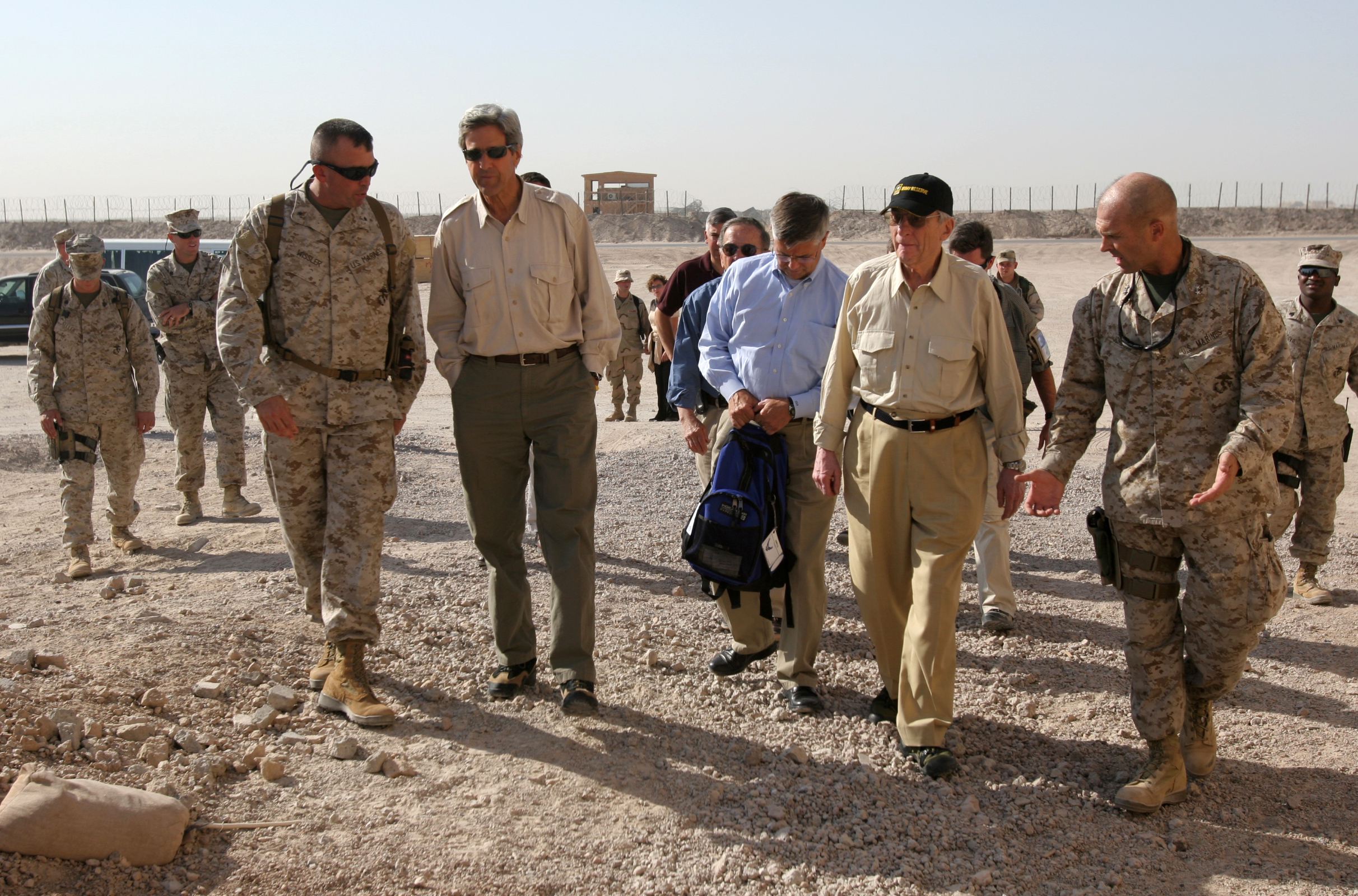
Senator Kerry in Iraq, September 2005

In the lead up to the Iraq War, Kerry said on October 9, 2002; "I will be voting to give the President of the United States the authority to use force, if necessary, to disarm Saddam Hussein because I believe that a deadly arsenal of weapons of mass destruction in his hands is a real and grave threat to our security." Bush relied on that resolution in ordering the 2003 invasion of Iraq. Kerry also gave a January 23, 2003, speech to Georgetown University saying "Without question, we need to disarm Saddam Hussein. He is a brutal, murderous dictator; leading an oppressive regime he presents a particularly grievous threat because he is so consistently prone to miscalculation. So the threat of Saddam Hussein with weapons of mass destruction is real." Kerry did, however, warn that the administration should exhaust its diplomatic avenues before launching war: "Mr. President, do not rush to war, take the time to build the coalition, because it's not winning the war that's hard, it's winning the peace that's hard."

After the invasion of Iraq, when no weapons of mass destruction were found, Kerry strongly criticized Bush, contending that he had misled the country: "When the President of the United States looks at you and tells you something, there should be some trust."

==== Libya ====
In 2011, Kerry supported American military action in Libya.

=== Leadership ===
Kerry chaired the Senate Select Committee on POW/MIA Affairs from 1991 to 1993. The committee's report, which Kerry endorsed, stated there was "no compelling evidence that proves that any American remains alive in captivity in Southeast Asia". In 1994 the Senate passed a resolution, sponsored by Kerry and fellow Vietnam veteran John McCain, that called for an end to the existing trade embargo against Vietnam; it was intended to pave the way for normalization. In 1995, President Bill Clinton normalized diplomatic relations with the country of Vietnam.

Kerry was the chairman of the Democratic Senatorial Campaign Committee from 1987 to 1989. He was reelected to the Senate in 1990, 1996 (after winning re-election against the then-Governor of Massachusetts Republican William Weld), 2002, and 2008. In January 2009, Kerry replaced Joe Biden as the chairman of the Senate Foreign Relations Committee.

As a role model for campus leaders across the nation and strong advocate for global development, Kerry was honored by the Millennium Campus Network (MCN) as a Global Generation Award winner in 2011.

=== Committee assignments ===
During his tenure, Kerry served on four Senate committees and nine subcommittees:

- Committee on Commerce, Science and Transportation
  - Subcommittee on Aviation Operations, Safety, and Security
  - Subcommittee on Communications, Technology, and the Internet (chairman)
  - Subcommittee on Competitiveness, Innovation, and Export Promotion
  - Subcommittee on Oceans, Atmosphere, Fisheries, and Coast Guard
  - Subcommittee on Science and Space
  - Subcommittee on Surface Transportation and Merchant Marine Infrastructure, Safety, and Security
- Committee on Finance
  - Subcommittee on Health Care
  - Subcommittee on Energy, Natural Resources, and Infrastructure
  - Subcommittee on International Trade, Customs, and Global Competitiveness
- Committee on Foreign Relations (Chairman 2009–2013)
- Committee on Small Business and Entrepreneurship
- Commission on Security and Cooperation in Europe
- Joint Select Committee on Deficit Reduction

=== Caucus memberships ===
- Congressional Bicameral High-Speed and Intercity Rail Caucus
- Congressional Internet Caucus
- Congressional Vietnam-Era Veterans Caucus (Co-chair)
- International Conservation Caucus
- Senate Prosecutors Caucus (Co-chair)
- Senate Oceans Caucus

=== Seniority ===
From the beginning of the 113th United States Congress until his resignation, Kerry ranked as the 7th most senior U.S. Senator. Due to the longevity of Ted Kennedy's service, Kerry was the most senior junior Senator in the 111th United States Congress. On Tuesday, August 25, 2009, Kerry became the senior senator from Massachusetts following Ted Kennedy's death.

=== Sponsorship of legislation ===
Areas of concern in the bills Kerry introduced into the Senate included small business concerns, education, terrorism, veterans' and POW/MIA issues, and marine resource protection. A full list of Kerry's sponsored legislation was available on his Senate web site.

During his Senate career, Kerry was primary sponsor of the following bills (excluding resolutions and amendments sponsored). This table does not count bills which Kerry co-sponsored.

Session	Years	Bills Sponsored	Signed into law
99th	1985–86	15	0
100th	1987–88	21	1
101st	1989–90	44	0
102nd	1991–92	28	1
103rd	1993–94	27	1, 2
104th	1995–96	32	0
105th	1997–98	19	0
106th	1999–00	33	1
107th	2001–02	81	1, 2, 3
108th	2003–04	30	1

A chronological list of various bills and resolutions sponsored by Kerry follows.

- A concurrent resolution condemning North Korea's support for terrorist activities. Measure passed Senate, amended. 100th Congress.
- A resolution relating to declassification of Documents, Files, and other materials pertaining to POWs and MIAs. Agreed to without amendment. 100th Congress.
- A bill to authorize appropriations to carry out the National Sea Grant College Program Act, and for other purposes. Signed by President.
- A bill to amend the Securities Exchange Act of 1934 to prohibit certain transactions with respect to managed accounts. Referred to committee. 102nd Congress.
- A bill to authorize appropriations for the Marine Mammal Protection Act of 1972 and to improve the program to reduce the incidental taking of marine mammals during the course of commercial fishing operations, and for other purposes. Became public law #103-238. 103rd Congress.
- A bill to amend the Small Business Act to enhance the business development opportunities of small business concerns owned and controlled by socially and economically disadvantaged individuals, and for other purposes. Referred to committee. 103rd Congress.
- A bill to designate a portion of the Sudbury, Assabet, and Concord Rivers as a component of the National Wild and Scenic Rivers System. Passed without objection. 105th Congress.
- A bill to amend the Small Business Act with respect to the women's business center program. Became Public Law #106-165. 106th Congress.
- A bill to authorize the Small Business Administration to provide financial and business development assistance to military reservists' small businesses, and for other purposes. Referred to committee. 106th Congress.
- A bill to amend the Small Business Act with respect to the microloan program, and for other purposes. Ordered to be Reported. 107th Congress.
- A bill to reauthorize the Small Business Technology Transfer Program, and for other purposes. Became Public Law #107-50. 107th Congress.
- A bill to provide assistance to small business concerns adversely impacted by the terrorist attacks against the United States on September 11, 2001, and for other purposes. Referred to committee. 107th Congress.
- A bill to provide emergency assistance to nonfarm-related small business concerns that have suffered substantial economic harm from drought. Referred to committee. 108th Congress.
- The Building and Upgrading Infrastructure for Long-Term Development (BUILD) Act, described by the National Taxpayers Union Foundation as its "most expensive bill of the Week" when it was introduced into the Senate in 2011.

== Presidential politics ==
=== 2004 presidential campaign ===
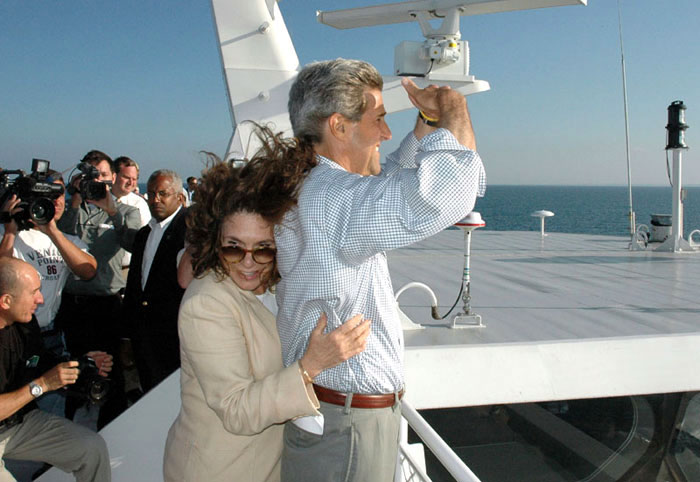
Kerry and Teresa Heinz crossing Lake Michigan on the Lake Express during the 2004 campaign

In the 2004 Democratic presidential primaries, John Kerry defeated several Democratic rivals, including Sen. John Edwards (D-North Carolina), former Vermont Governor Howard Dean and retired Army General Wesley Clark. His victory in the Iowa caucuses is widely believed to be the tipping point where Kerry revived his sagging campaign in New Hampshire and the February 3, 2004, primary states like Arizona, South Carolina and New Mexico. Kerry then went on to win landslide victories in Nevada and Wisconsin. Kerry thus won the Democratic nomination to run for President of the United States against incumbent George W. Bush. On July 6, 2004, he announced his selection of John Edwards as his running mate. Democratic strategist Bob Shrum, who was Kerry's 2004 campaign adviser, wrote an article in Time magazine claiming that after the election, Kerry had said he wished he had never picked Edwards, and that the two have since stopped speaking to each other. In a subsequent appearance on ABC's This Week, Kerry refused to respond to Shrum's allegation, calling it a "ridiculous waste of time".

Kerry on the campaign trail in Rochester, Minnesota

During his bid to be elected president in 2004, Kerry frequently criticized President George W. Bush for starting the Iraq War. While Kerry had initially voted in support of authorizing President Bush to use force in dealing with Saddam Hussein, he voted against an $87 billion supplemental appropriations bill to pay for the subsequent war. His statement on March 16, 2004, "I actually did vote for the $87 billion before I voted against it", helped the Bush campaign paint him as a flip-flopper and has been cited as contributing to Kerry's defeat.

On November 3, 2004, Kerry conceded the race. Kerry won 59.03 million votes, or 48.3 percent of the popular vote; Bush won 62.04 million votes, or 50.7 percent of the popular vote. Kerry carried states with a total of 252 electoral votes. One Kerry elector voted for Kerry's running mate, Edwards, so in the final tally Kerry had 251 electoral votes to Bush's 286. He was the first Democrat since Michael Dukakis in 1988 to lose the popular vote in a presidential election, (Note: Democratic nominees Bill Clinton in 1992 and 1996 and Al Gore in 2000 have won the popular in three consecutive elections) and he was also the last Democrat until Kamala Harris in 2024 to do so. (Note: Democratic nominees Barack Obama in 2008 and 2012, Hillary Clinton in 2016, and Joe Biden in 2020 have won the popular in four consecutive elections)

=== Endorsements of Obama in 2008 and 2012 ===
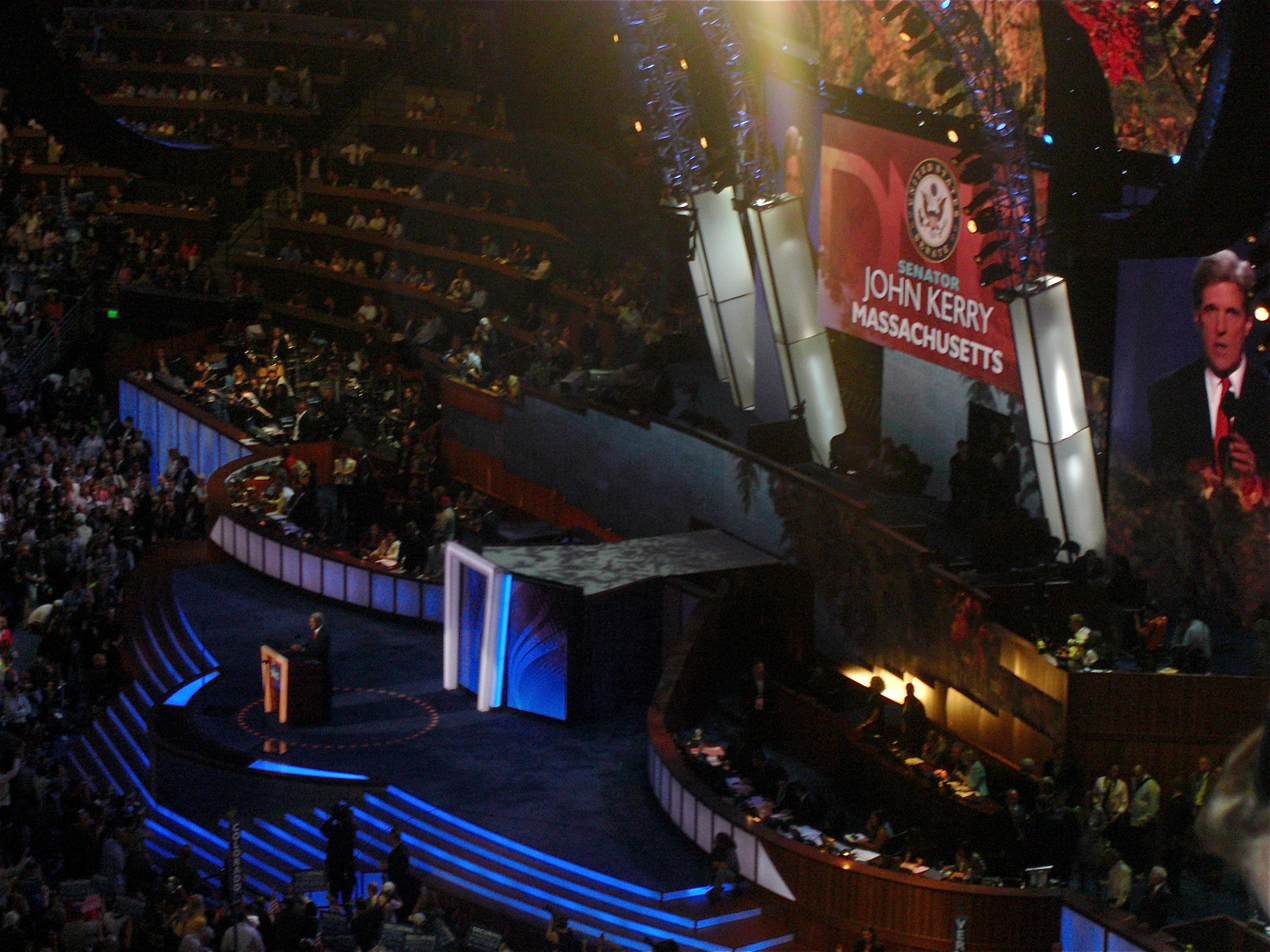
Kerry speaking during the third night of the 2008 Democratic National Convention in Denver, Colorado

Immediately after the 2004 election, some Democrats mentioned Kerry as a possible contender for the 2008 Democratic nomination. His brother had said such a campaign was "conceivable", and Kerry himself reportedly said at a farewell party for his 2004 campaign staff, "There's always another four years".

Kerry established a separate political action committee, Keeping America's Promise, which declared as its mandate "A Democratic Congress will restore accountability to Washington and help change a disastrous course in Iraq", and raised money and channeled contributions to Democratic candidates in state and federal races. Through Keeping America's Promise in 2005, Kerry raised over $5.5 million for other Democrats up and down the ballot. Through his campaign account and his political action committee, the Kerry campaign operation generated more than $10 million for various party committees and 179 candidates for the U.S. House, Senate, state and local offices in 42 states focusing on the midterm elections during the 2006 election cycle. "Cumulatively, John Kerry has done as much if not more than any other individual senator", Hassan Nemazee, the national finance chairman of the DSCC said.

On January 10, 2008, Kerry endorsed Illinois Senator Barack Obama for president in the 2008 Democratic presidential primaries (in which Kerry's 2004 running mate, Edwards, was also a candidate). Kerry was mentioned as a possible vice presidential candidate for Senator Obama, although fellow Senator Joe Biden was eventually chosen. After Biden's acceptance of the vice presidential nomination, speculation arose that John Kerry would be a candidate for Secretary of State in the Obama administration. However, Senator Hillary Clinton was offered the position.

During the 2012 Obama reelection campaign, Kerry participated in one-on-one debate prep with the president, impersonating the Republican candidate Mitt Romney.

=== Subsequent endorsements ===
In February 2014, Kerry answered in an interview that he would not run in the 2016 presidential election. In August 2015, Kerry, serving as Secretary of State, declared he would remain neutral during the 2016 Democratic presidential primaries. After Hillary Clinton became the party's presumptive nominee (the first female major party presidential nominee in United States history), Kerry described it as a "truly historic moment" worth celebrating.

On December 5, 2019, Kerry endorsed Joe Biden's campaign for the 2020 Democratic nomination for president, saying "He'll be ready on day one to put back together the country and the world that Donald Trump has broken apart", and asserting that "Joe will defeat Donald Trump next November. He's the candidate with the wisdom and standing to fix what Trump has broken, to restore our place in the world, and improve the lives of working people here at home." Kerry delivered a speech as part of the 2020 Democratic National Convention, characterizing the foreign policy of the first Trump presidency as a continuous "blooper reel".

In July 2024, Kerry endorsed Vice President Kamala Harris's campaign in the 2024 presidential election.

== Secretary of State (2013–2017) ==
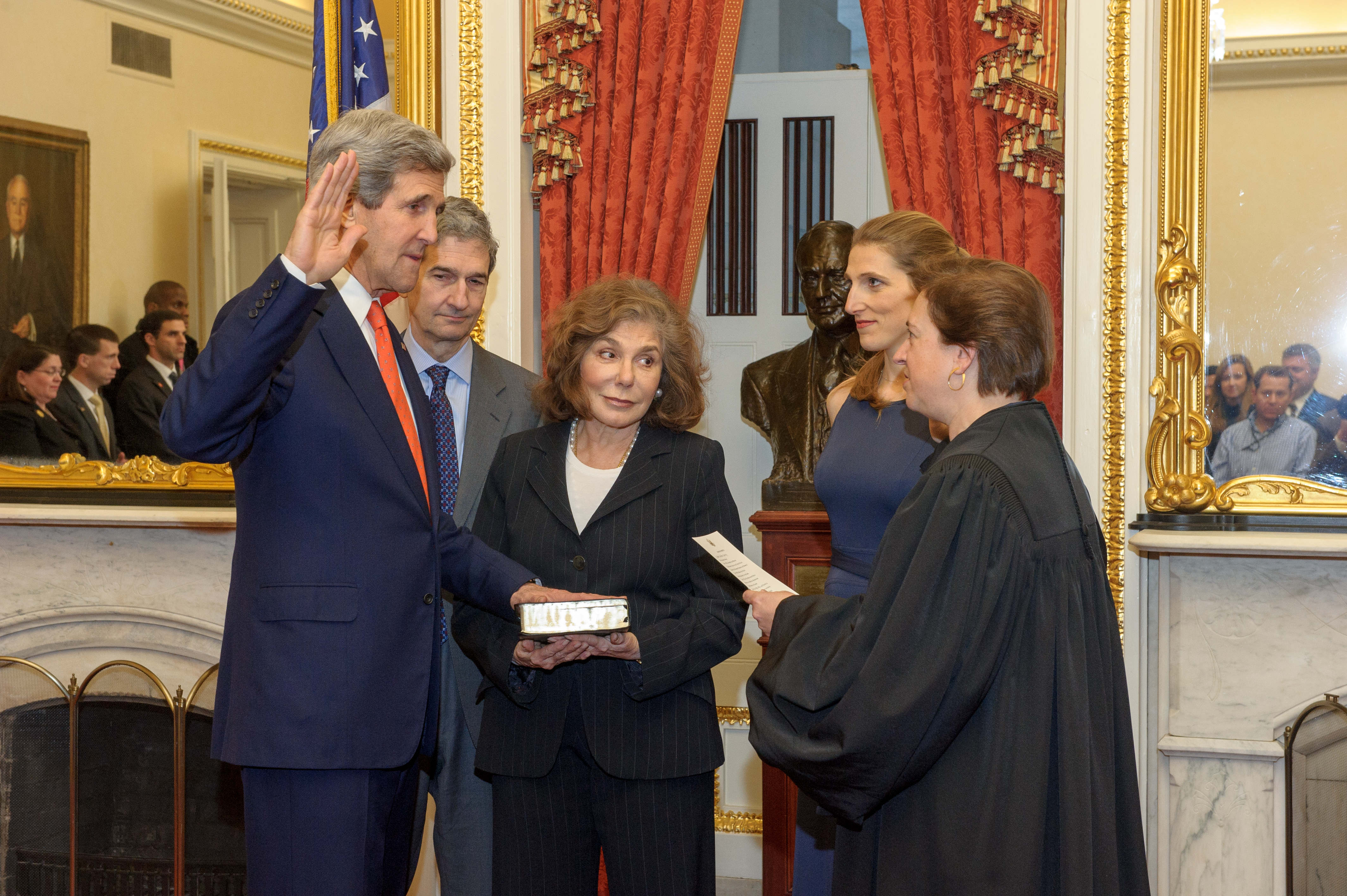
John Kerry was sworn in as Secretary of State by Justice Elena Kagan on February 1, 2013.

=== Nomination and confirmation ===
On December 15, 2012, several news outlets reported President Barack Obama would nominate Kerry to succeed Hillary Clinton as Secretary of State, after Susan Rice, widely seen as Obama's preferred choice, withdrew her name from consideration citing a politicized confirmation process following criticism of her response to the 2012 Benghazi attack. On December 21, Obama proposed the nomination, which received positive commentary. His confirmation hearing took place on January 24, 2013, before the Senate Foreign Relations Committee, the same panel where he first testified in 1971. The committee unanimously voted to approve him on January 29, 2013, and the same day the full Senate confirmed him on a vote of 94–3. In a letter to Massachusetts Governor Deval Patrick, Kerry announced his resignation from the Senate effective February 1.

=== Tenure ===
Kerry was sworn in as Secretary of State on February 1, 2013.

While serving as the Secretary of State, Kerry spoke in the French language on several occasions in his official capacity.

After six months of rigorous diplomacy within the Middle East, Kerry was able to have Israeli and Palestinian negotiators agree to start the 2013–2014 Israeli–Palestinian peace talks. Senior U.S. officials stated the two sides were able to meet on July 30, 2013, at the State Department without American mediators following a dinner the previous evening hosted by Kerry.

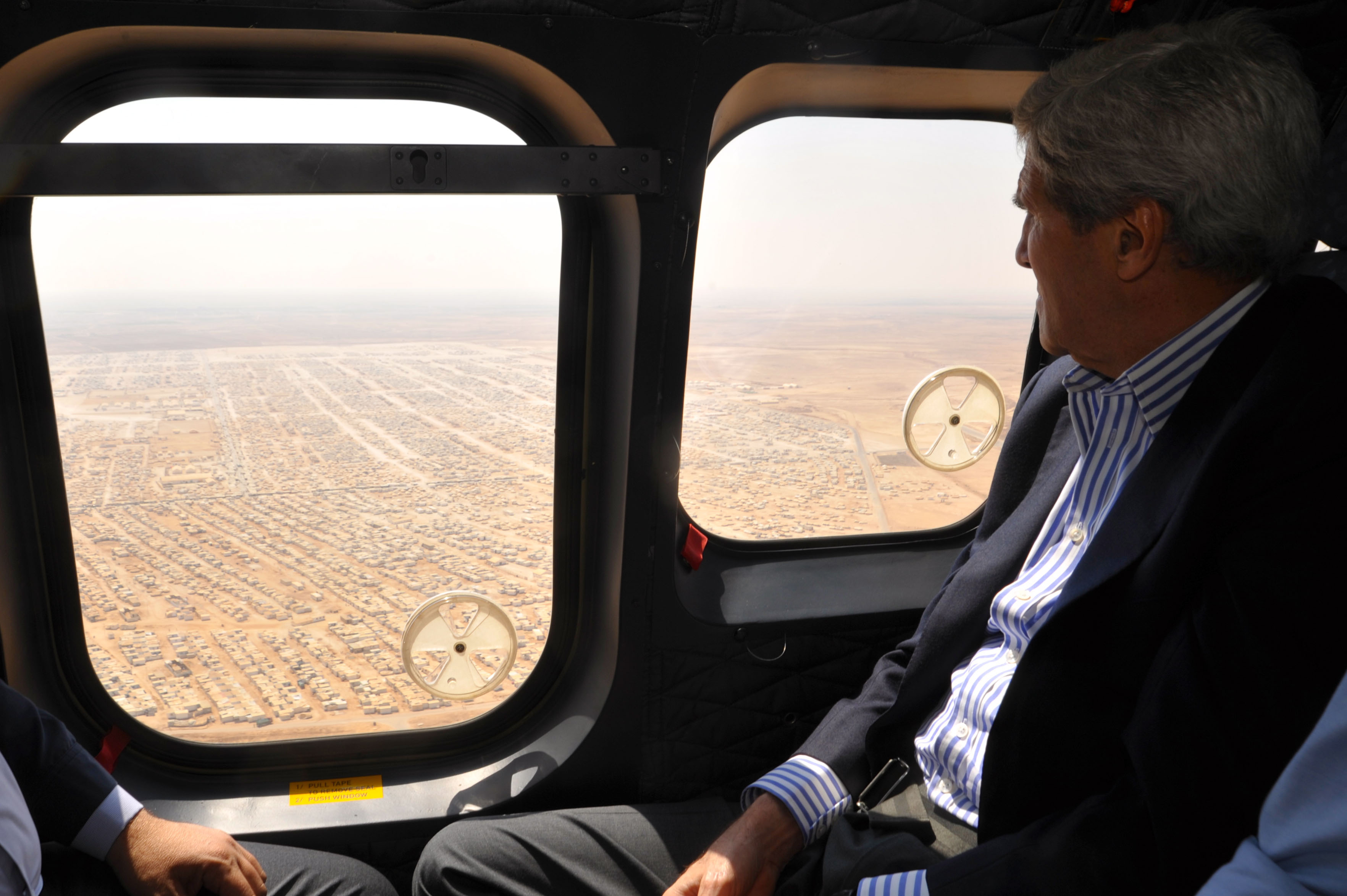
Kerry views the Mrajeeb al-Fhood camp for Syrian refugees in 2014. Syrian rebels received support from the United States.

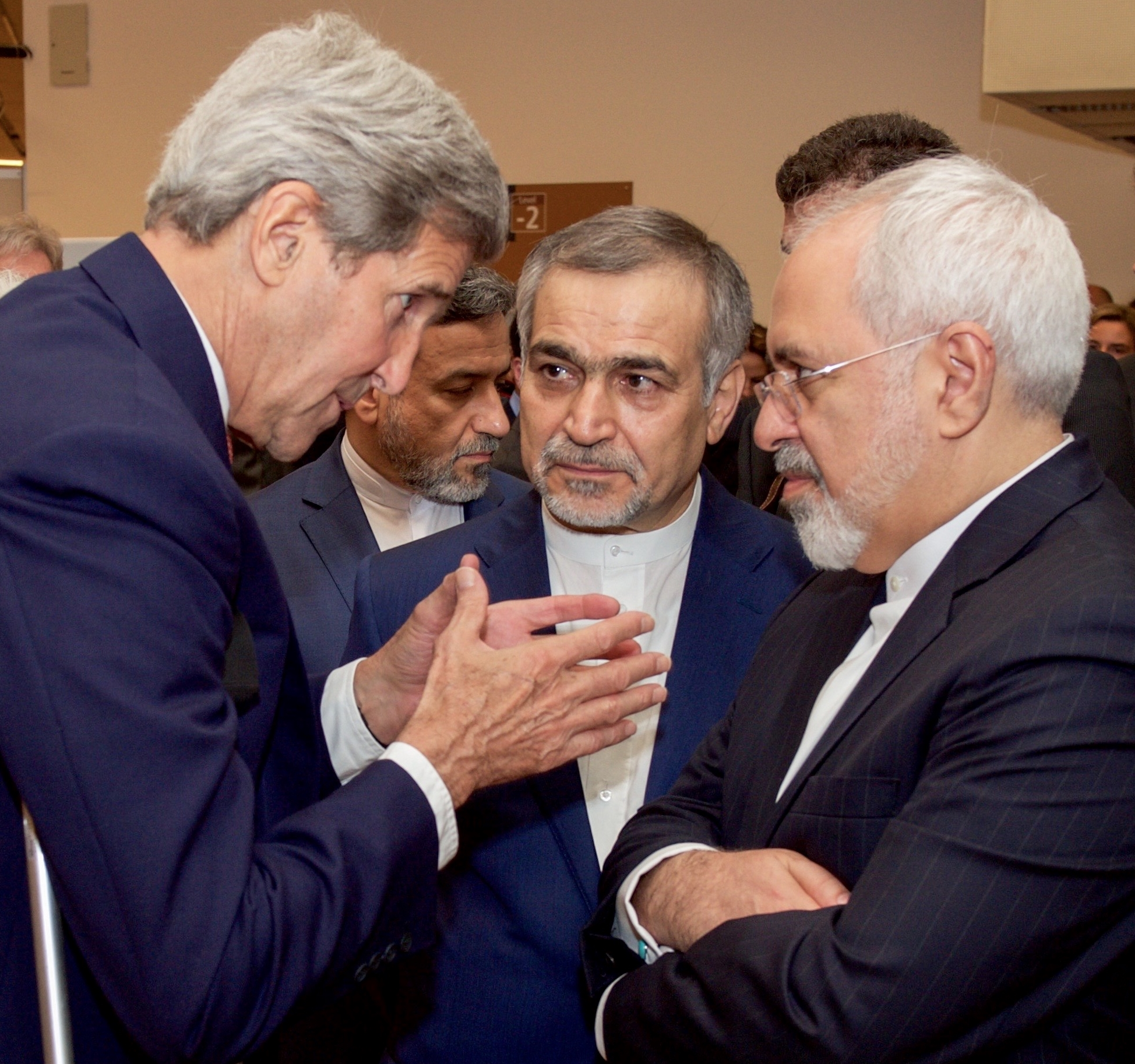
Kerry with Hossein Fereydoun and Mohammad Javad Zarif during the announcement of the Joint Comprehensive Plan of Action, July 14, 2015

On September 27, 2013, he met with the Iranian Foreign Minister Mohammad Javad Zarif during the P5+1 and Iran summit, which eventually led to the JCPOA nuclear agreement. It was the highest-level direct contact between the United States and Iran in the last six years, and made him the first U.S. Secretary of State to have met with his Iranian counterpart since 1979 Iranian Revolution.

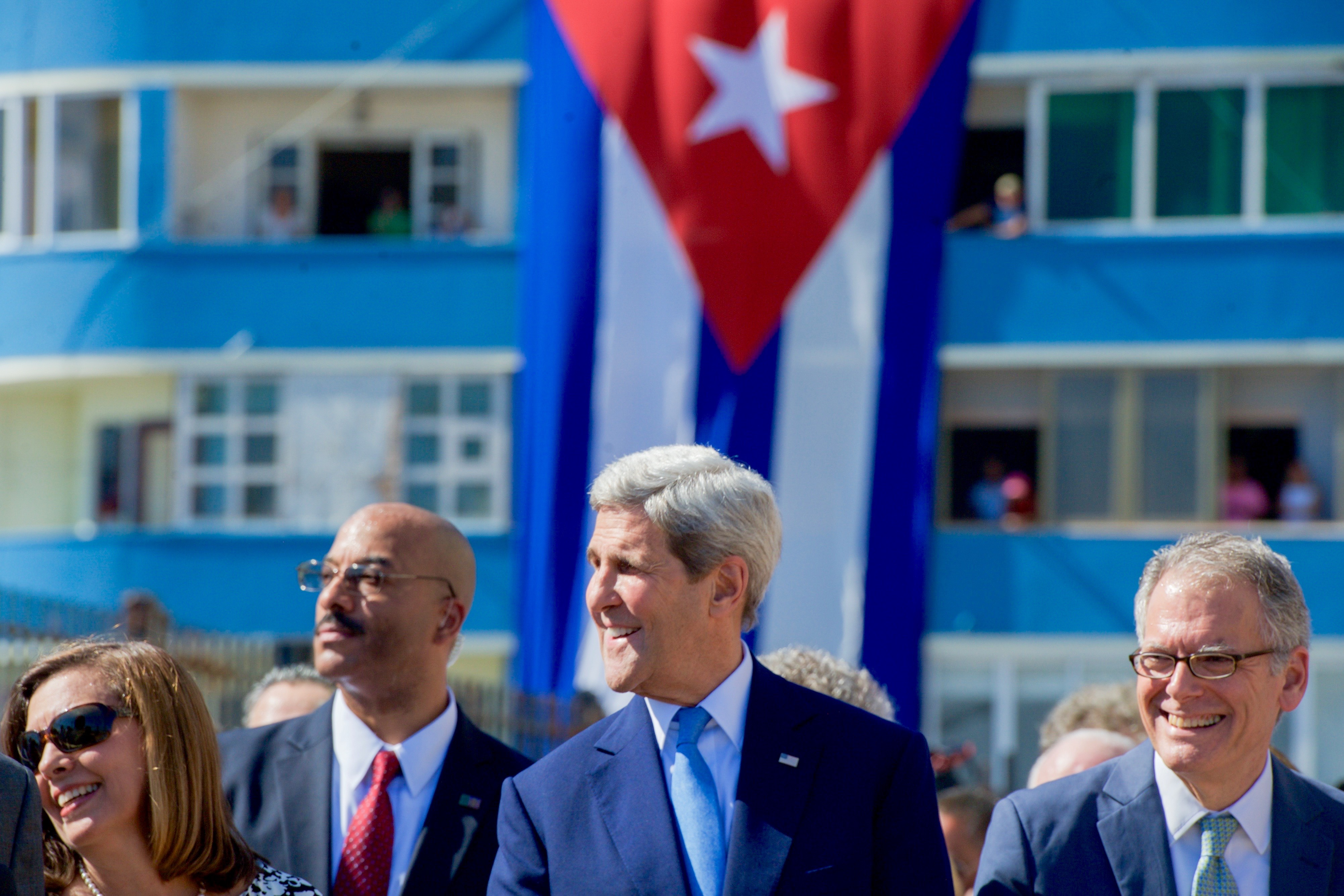
Kerry was the first U.S. secretary of state to visit Cuba since 1945.

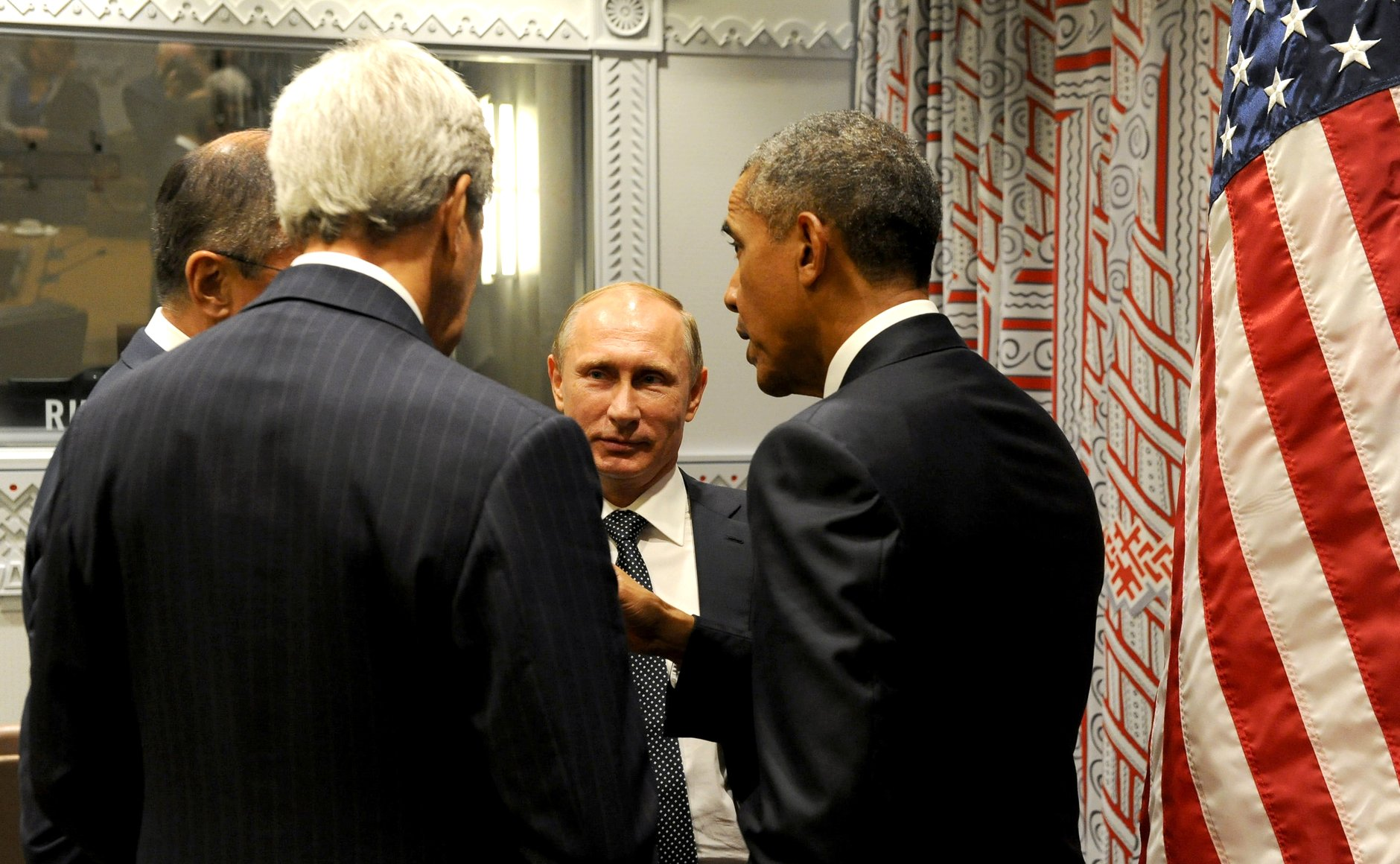
John Kerry and Barack Obama meet with Russian President Vladimir Putin to discuss Syria, September 29, 2015.

In the State Department, Kerry quickly earned a reputation "for being aloof, keeping to himself, and not bothering to read staff memos". Career State Department officials complained power became too centralized under Kerry's leadership, which slowed department operations when Kerry was on frequent overseas trips. Others in State described Kerry as having "a kind of diplomatic attention deficit disorder" as he shifted from topic to topic instead of focusing on long-term strategy. When asked whether he was traveling too much, he responded, "Hell no. I'm not slowing down." Despite Kerry's early achievements, morale at State was lower than under Hillary Clinton, according to department employees. However, after Kerry's first six months in the State Department, a Gallup poll found he had high approval ratings among Americans as Secretary of State. After a year, another poll showed Kerry's favorability continued to rise. Less than two years into Kerry's term, the Foreign Policy Magazine's 2014 Ivory Tower survey of international relations scholars asked, "Who was the most effective U.S. Secretary of State in the past 50 years?"; John Kerry and Lawrence Eagleburger tied for 11th place out of the 15 confirmed Secretaries of State in that period.

In January 2014, having met with Vatican Secretary of State Archbishop Pietro Parolin, Kerry said: "We touched on just about every major issue that we are both working on, that are issues of concern to all of us. First of all, we talked at great length about Syria, and I was particularly appreciative for the Archbishop's raising this issue, and equally grateful for the Holy Father's comments – the Pope's comments yesterday regarding his support for the Geneva II process. We welcome that support. It is very important to have broad support, and I know that the Pope is particularly concerned about the massive numbers of displaced human beings and the violence that has taken over 130,000 lives."

Kerry expressed support for Israel's right to defend itself during the 2014 Israel–Gaza conflict.

Kerry said the United States supported the Saudi Arabian-led intervention in Yemen because Saudi Arabia, an ally, was threatened "very directly" by the takeover of neighboring Yemen by the Houthis, but noted that the United States would not reflexively support Saudi Arabia's proxy wars against Iran.

On December 28, 2016, soon after United Nations Security Council Resolution 2334 passed 14–0 with the U.S. abstaining, Kerry joined the rest of the U.N. Security Council in strongly criticizing Israel's settlement policies in a speech. His speech and criticisms were met with negative reactions from Israeli Prime Minister Benjamin Netanyahu, while UK Prime Minister Theresa May distanced the UK from Kerry's strongly worded speech in what appeared to be an attempt to build bridges with the incoming Trump administration. Kerry's speech received positive reactions from Arab nations, but some criticized his remarks as too little, too late from the outgoing administration.

=== Syria ===
Following the August 21, 2013 chemical weapons attack on the Ghouta suburbs of Damascus attributed to Syrian government forces, Kerry became a leading advocate for the use of military force against the Syrian government for what he called "a despot's brutal and flagrant use of chemical weapons".

On September 9, in response to a reporter's question about whether Syrian President Bashar al-Assad could avert a military strike, Kerry said "He could turn over every single bit of his chemical weapons to the international community in the next week. Turn it over, all of it, without delay, and allow a full and total accounting for that. But he isn't about to do it, and it can't be done, obviously." This unscripted remark initiated a process that would lead to Syria agreeing to relinquish and destroy its chemical weapons arsenal, as Russia treated Kerry's statement as a serious proposal. Russian Foreign Minister Sergey Lavrov said Russia would work "immediately" to convince Syria relinquish and destroy its large chemical weapons arsenal. Syria quickly welcomed this proposal and on September 14, the UN formally accepted Syria's application to join the convention banning chemical weapons, and separately, the U.S. and Russia agreed on a plan to eliminate Syria's chemical weapons by the middle of 2014, leading Kerry to declare on July 20, 2014: "we struck a deal where we got 100 percent of the chemical weapons out". On September 28, the UN Security Council passed a resolution ordering the destruction of Syria's chemical weapons and condemning the August 21 Ghouta attack.

=== Latin America ===
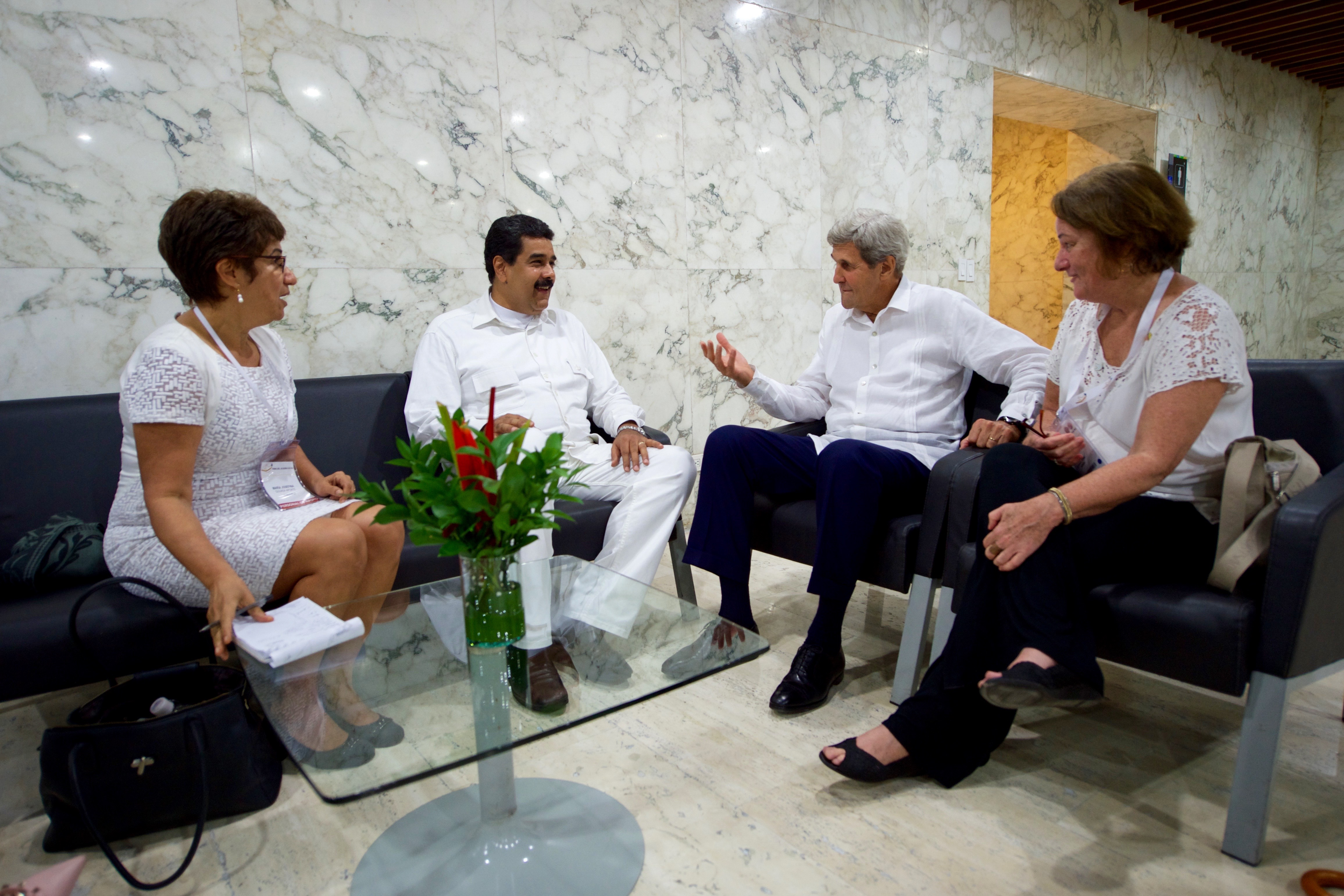
Kerry speaks with Venezuelan President Nicolás Maduro in September 2016

In a speech before the Organization of American States in November 2013, Kerry remarked that the era of the Monroe Doctrine was over. He went on to explain, "The relationship that we seek and that we have worked hard to foster is not about a United States declaration about how and when it will intervene in the affairs of other American states. It's about all of our countries viewing one another as equals, sharing responsibilities, cooperating on security issues, and adhering not to doctrine, but to the decisions that we make as partners to advance the values and the interests that we share."

=== Environmentalism ===
In April 2016, he signed the Paris Climate Accords at the United Nations in New York.

On November 11, 2016, Kerry became the first Secretary of State and highest-ranking U.S. official to date to visit Antarctica. Kerry spent two days on the continent meeting with researchers and staying overnight at McMurdo Station.

In 1994, Kerry led opposition to continued funding for the Integral Fast Reactor, which resulted in the end of funding for the project. However, in light of increasing concerns regarding climate change, in 2017 Kerry reversed his position on nuclear power, saying "Given this challenge we face today, and given the progress of fourth generation nuclear: go for it. No other alternative, zero emissions."

=== Global Connect initiative ===
In September 2015, the U.S. Department of State unveiled a new initiative called "Global Connect" which sought to provide internet access to more than 1.5 billion people around the world within five years. In 2016, in partnership with OPIC, Kerry announced an investment of $171 million to enable "a low-cost and rapidly scalable wireless broadband network in India". OPIC's financing is aimed at helping its Indian partner, Tikona Digital Networks, to provide Internet through wireless technology.

== Out of government (2017–2021) ==
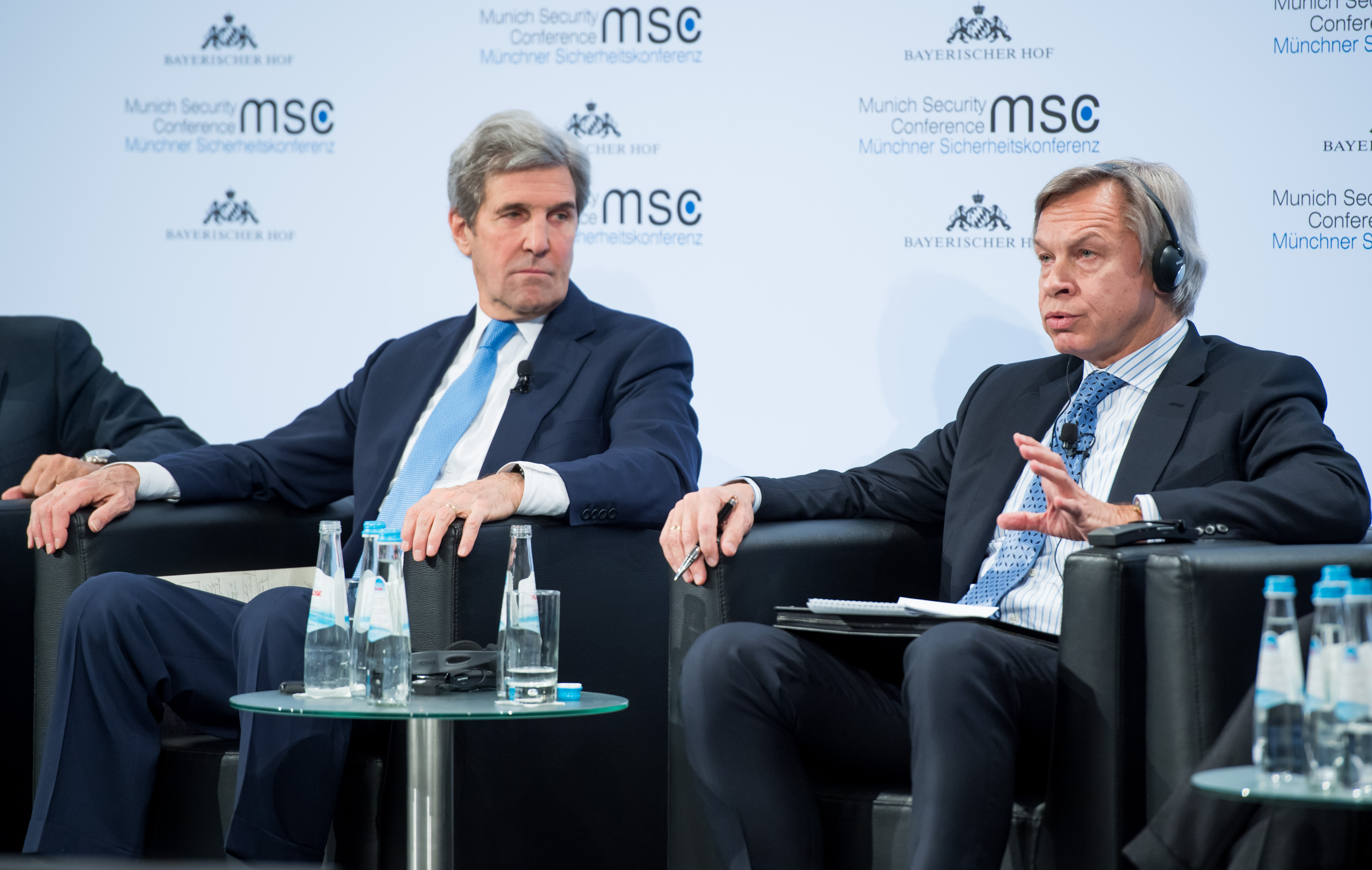
Kerry and Russian Senator Aleksey Pushkov in Munich in 2018

Kerry retired from his diplomatic work following the end of the Obama administration on January 20, 2017. He did not attend Donald Trump's inauguration on that day, and the following day took part in the 2017 Women's March in Washington, D.C. Kerry took a strong stand against Trump's policies and joined in filing a brief arguing against Trump's executive order banning entry of persons from seven Muslim countries. In November 2018, in a "Guardian Live" conversation with Andrew Rawnsley, sponsored by The Guardian at London's Central Hall, Kerry discussed several issues which have developed further since his tenure as Secretary of State, including migration into Europe and climate change.

Following retirement from government service, Kerry signed an agreement with Simon & Schuster for publishing his planned memoirs, dealing with his life and career in government. In September 2018, he published Every Day Is Extra.

=== Leaked audiotape ===
On April 25, 2021, The New York Times published content from a leaked audiotape of a three-hour taped conversation between economist Saeed Leylaz and Iranian foreign minister Mohammad Javad Zarif. The taped conversation was connected to an oral history project, known as "In the Islamic Republic the military field rules", which documents the work of Iran's current administration. The tape was obtained by the London-based news channel Iran International.

In the tape, which the Times referred to as "extraordinary", Zarif reveals that then-Secretary of State Kerry told him Israel had attacked Iranian assets in Syria, "at least 200 times". Although the tape has not been verified, the spokesman for the Iranian foreign ministry, Saeed Khatibzadeh, did not deny its validity.

Nineteen Republican senators signed a letter asking President Biden to investigate Zarif's claim that Kerry told him Israel had attacked Iranian assets in Syria, "at least 200 times". On April 27, 2021, Republicans called on Kerry to resign from the Biden administration's National Security Council. In a tweet, Kerry denied Zarif's account, writing, "I can tell you that this story and these allegations are unequivocally false. This never happened — either when I was Secretary of State or since."

== Special Presidential Envoy for Climate (2021–2024) ==
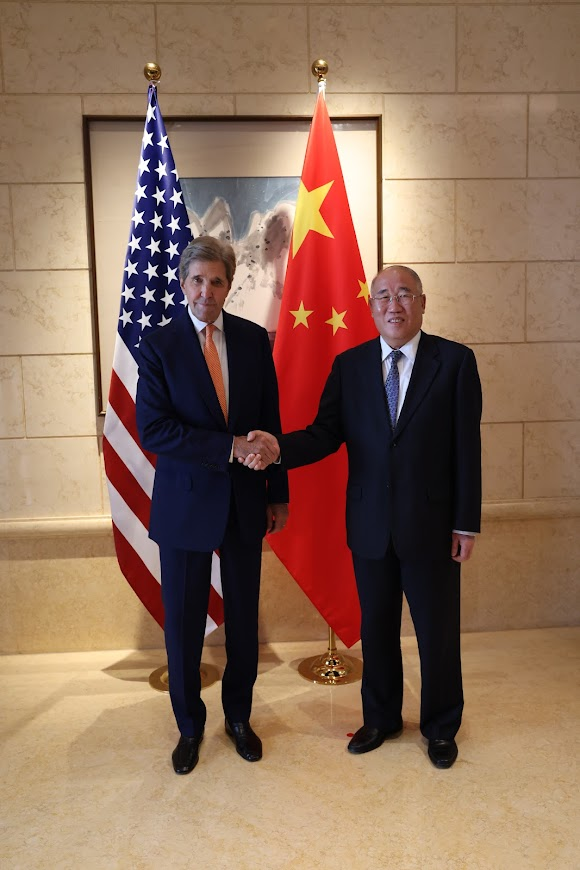
Kerry with Xie Zhenhua in Beijing, 2023

On November 23, 2020, President-elect Joe Biden's transition team announced Kerry would be taking a full-time position in the administration, serving as a special envoy for climate; in this role he was a principal on the National Security Council.

Kerry assumed office on January 20, 2021, following Biden's inauguration. He negotiated the U.S.–China Joint Glasgow Declaration climate agreement between the U.S. and China with Chinese envoy Xie Zhenhua, which was announced at the 2021 United Nations Climate Change Conference.

In June 2023, Kerry made visits to Israel, Jordan, and the United Arab Emirates. In Israel, he emphasized the need for climate legislation to reach climate targets and reached an agreement about the renewal of the Memorandum of understanding between Israel and the United States Environmental Protection Agency. Israel is one of the few developed countries which have still not approved a climate law and lags behind other OECD countries in climate action. Israeli environmental protection minister Idit Silman said Israel intended to go to COP28 "with an ambitious and applicable climate law and put the State of Israel on the same level as the developed countries of the OECD."

Kerry visited China for advance climate cooperation in July 2023. The main achievement of the visit was some progress in the fields of: "methane reduction commitments; reducing China's reliance on coal; China's objections to trade restrictions on solar panel and battery components; and climate finance." This was obtained despite many existing obstacles to cooperation. Kerry's visit was made in the middle of the 2023 Asia heat wave that set a new record of 52.2 °C (126.0 °F) in Sanbu, Xinjiang, China, which Kerry highlighted.

At the end of July 2023, Kerry visited India, which included declarations of American committal to the target of delivering $100 billion for climate action to low income countries and that no future US president could retreat from climate commitment. He criticized Donald Trump for leaving the Paris Agreement in 2020.

On January 13, 2024, at least three sources close to Kerry revealed he would step down as U.S. climate envoy by the upcoming spring. He told the Financial Times he planned to stay active in the climate finance space. He officially resigned from his position on March 6, 2024.

== Personal and family life ==
=== Ancestry ===
Kerry's paternal ancestors came from the Fränkel family, which owned a textile factory in Neustadt, Upper Silesia (now Prudnik, Poland), founded by Samuel Fränkel. The Fränkels originated from Hotzenplotz, Austria (now Osoblaha, Czech Republic) and Zülz, Prussia (now Biała Prudnicka, Poland). Kerry's paternal great-grandmother, Mathilda Fränkel, was born in Oberglogau (now Głogówek, near Prudnik) and married Benedikt Kohn from Bennisch (now Horní Benešov). His grandparents, shoe businessman Frederick A. "Fred" Kerry and musician Ida Löwe, immigrated from the Austro-Hungarian Empire to the U.S. Fred, his wife, and his brother converted from Judaism to Catholicism in 1901, and changed their names from Kohn to Kerry. Ida was of remote ancestry of Rabbi Sinai Loew of Worms, brother of Judah Loew ben Bezalel. Fred and Ida Kerry emigrated to the United States in 1905, living at first in Chicago and eventually moving to Brookline, Massachusetts, by 1915. According to The New York Times, "[the] brother and sister of John Kerry's paternal grandmother, Otto and Jenni Lowe, died in concentration camps". Kerry's Jewish ancestry was publicly revealed during his 2004 presidential campaign; he has stated that he was unaware of it until a reporter informed him of it in 2003.

Kerry's maternal ancestors were of Scottish and English descent, and his maternal grandparents were James Grant Forbes II of the Forbes family and Margaret Tyndal Winthrop of the Dudley–Winthrop family. Margaret's paternal grandfather Robert Charles Winthrop served as the 22nd Speaker of the U.S. House of Representatives. Robert's father was Governor Thomas Lindall Winthrop. Thomas' father John Still Winthrop was a great-great-grandson of Massachusetts Bay Colony Governor John Winthrop, and great-grandson of Governor Thomas Dudley. Through his mother, Kerry is a first cousin of French politician Brice Lalonde.

=== Marriages and children ===
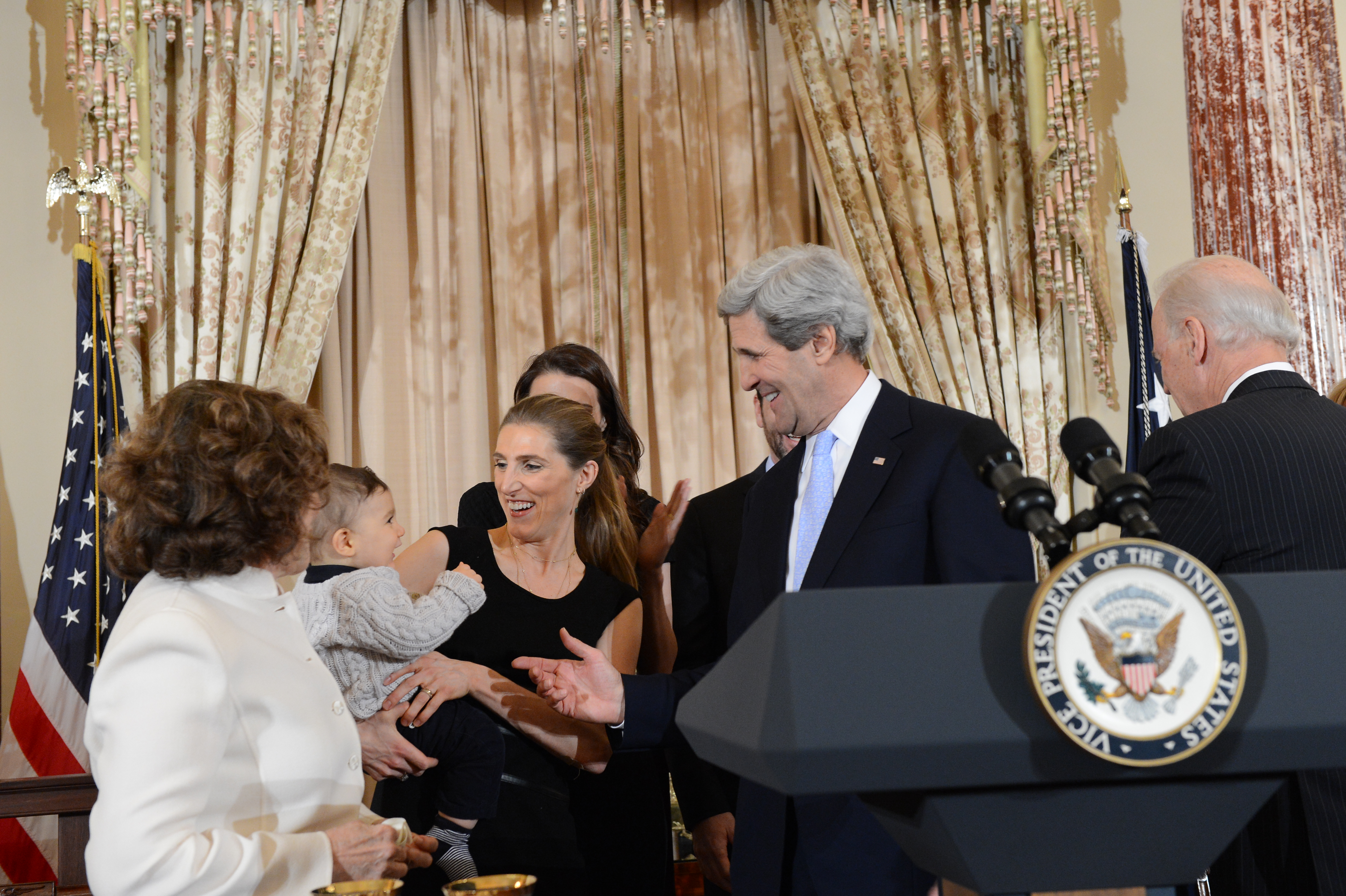
Kerry's daughter Vanessa and grandson Alexander

Kerry was married to Julia Thorne in 1970, and they had two daughters together: documentary filmmaker Alexandra Kerry (born September 5, 1973) and physician Vanessa Kerry (born December 31, 1976).

Alexandra was born days before Kerry began law school. In 1982, Julia asked Kerry for a separation while she was suffering from severe depression. They were divorced on July 25, 1988, and the marriage was formally annulled in 1997. "After 14 years as a political wife, I associated politics only with anger, fear and loneliness", she wrote in A Change of Heart, her book about depression. Thorne later married Richard Charlesworth, an architect, and moved to Bozeman, Montana, where she became active in local environmental groups such as the Greater Yellowstone Coalition. Thorne supported Kerry's 2004 presidential run. She died of cancer on April 27, 2006.

Kerry and his second wife—Portuguese-born businesswoman and philanthropist Teresa Heinz, the widow of Kerry's late Pennsylvania Republican Senate colleague John Heinz—were introduced to each other by Heinz at an Earth Day rally in 1990. Early the following year, Senator Heinz was killed in a plane crash near Lower Merion. Teresa has three sons from her marriage to Heinz, Henry John IV, André, and Christopher. Heinz and Kerry were married on May 26, 1995, in Nantucket, Massachusetts.

=== Net worth ===
The Forbes 400 survey estimated in 2004 that Teresa Heinz Kerry had a net worth of $750 million. However, estimates have frequently varied, ranging from around $165 million to as high as $3.2 billion, according to a study in the Los Angeles Times. Regardless of which figure is correct, Kerry was the wealthiest U.S. Senator while serving in the Senate. Independent of Heinz, Kerry is wealthy in his own right, and is the beneficiary of at least four trusts inherited from Forbes family relatives, including his mother Rosemary Forbes Kerry, who died in 2002. Forbes magazine (named for the Forbes family of publishers, unrelated to Kerry) estimated that if elected, and if Heinz family assets were included, Kerry would have been the third-richest U.S. president in history, when adjusted for inflation. This assessment was based on Heinz's and Kerry's combined assets, but the couple signed a prenuptial agreement that keeps their assets separate. Kerry's financial disclosure form for 2011 put his personal assets in the range of $230,000,000 to $320,000,000, including the assets of his spouse and any dependent children. This included slightly more than $3,000,000 worth of H. J. Heinz Company assets, which increased in value by over $600,000 in 2013 when Berkshire Hathaway announced their intention to purchase the company.

In April 2017, Kerry purchased an 18-acre property on the northwest corner of Martha's Vineyard overlooking Vineyard Sound in the town of Chilmark, Massachusetts. The property is located in Seven Gates Farm and according to property records, cost $11.75 million for the seven bedroom home.

=== Religious beliefs ===
Kerry is a Roman Catholic, and is said to have carried a religious rosary, a prayer book, and a St. Christopher medal (the patron saint of travelers) when he campaigned. Discussing his faith, Kerry said: "I thought of being a priest. I was very religious while at school in Switzerland. I was an altar boy and prayed all the time. I was very centered around the Mass and the church." He also said the Letters of Paul (Apostle Paul) moved him the most, stating that they taught him to "not feel sorry for [him]self".

Kerry told Christianity Today in October 2004:

I'm a Catholic and I practice, but at the same time I have an open-mindedness to many other expressions of spirituality that come through different religions ... I've spent some time reading and thinking about religion and trying to study it, and I've arrived at not so much a sense of the differences, but a sense of the similarities in so many ways.

He said that he believes the Torah, the Quran, and the Bible all share a fundamental story which connects with readers.

=== Health ===
In 2003, Kerry was diagnosed with and successfully treated for prostate cancer. On May 31, 2015, Kerry broke his right leg in a biking accident in Scionzier, France, and was flown to Boston's Massachusetts General Hospital for recovery. MGH Hip and Knee Replacement Orthopaedic Surgeon Dr. Dennis Burke, who had met Kerry in France and accompanied him in the plane from France to Boston, set Kerry's right leg on Tuesday, June 2, in a four-hour operation.

=== Athletics and sailing ===
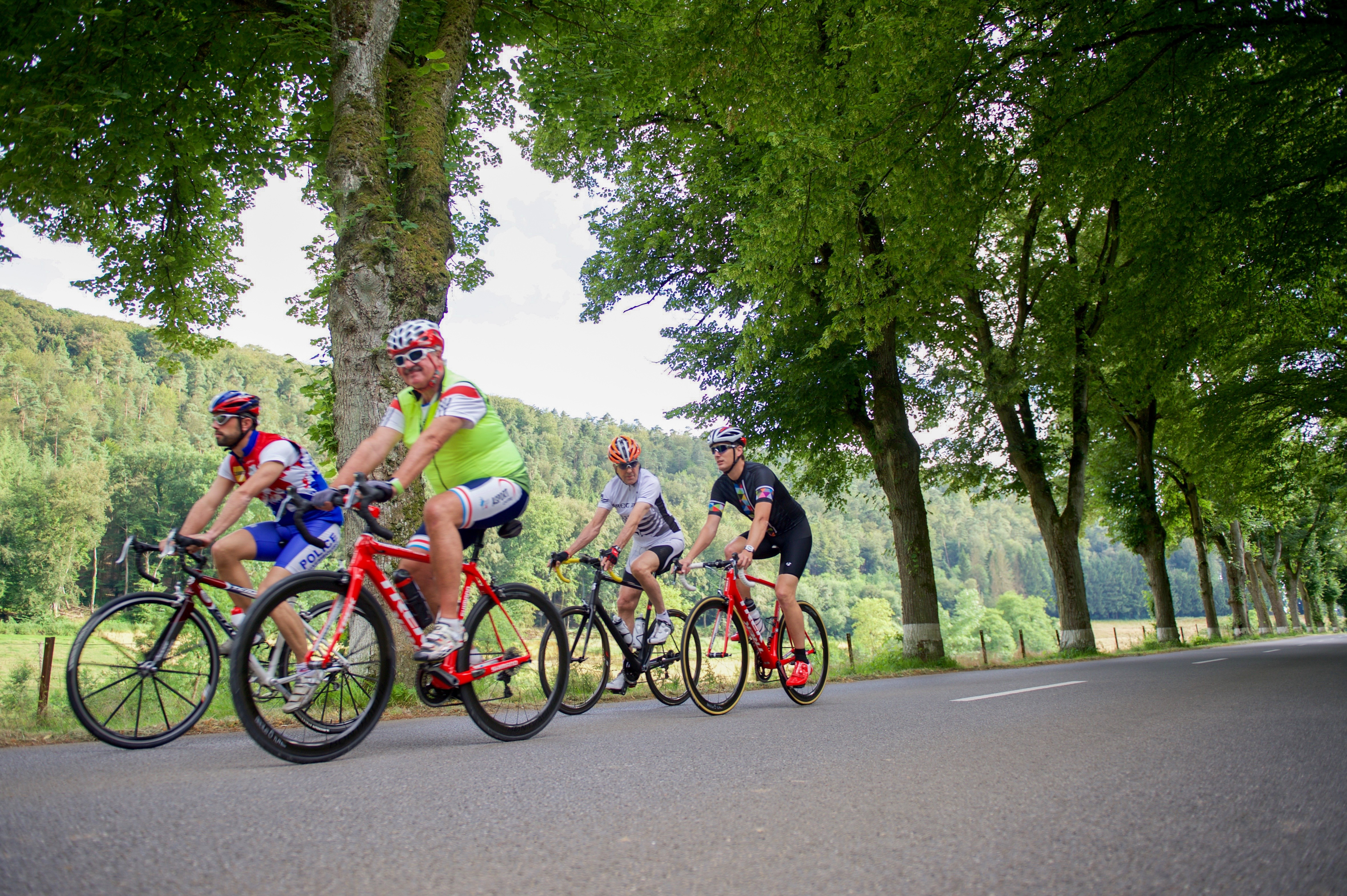
Kerry (in white) on a bike ride with Luxembourgish Foreign Minister Jean Asselborn (in green) and Tour de France winner Andy Schleck (in black) in 2016

In addition to the sports he played at Yale, Kerry is described by Sports Illustrated, among others, as an "avid cyclist", primarily riding on a road bike. Prior to his presidential bid, Kerry had participated in several long-distance rides. During his many campaigns, he was reported to have visited bicycle stores in both his home state and elsewhere. His staff requested recumbent stationary bikes for his hotel rooms. He has also been a snowboarder, windsurfer, and sailor.

The Boston Herald reported on July 23, 2010, that Kerry commissioned construction on a new $7 million yacht (a Friendship 75) in New Zealand and moored it in Portsmouth, Rhode Island, where the Friendship yacht company is based. The article claimed this allowed him to avoid paying Massachusetts taxes on the property including approximately $437,500 in sales tax and an annual excise tax of about $500. On July 27, Kerry stated he would voluntarily pay $500,000 in Massachusetts taxes on his yacht.

== Honors ==
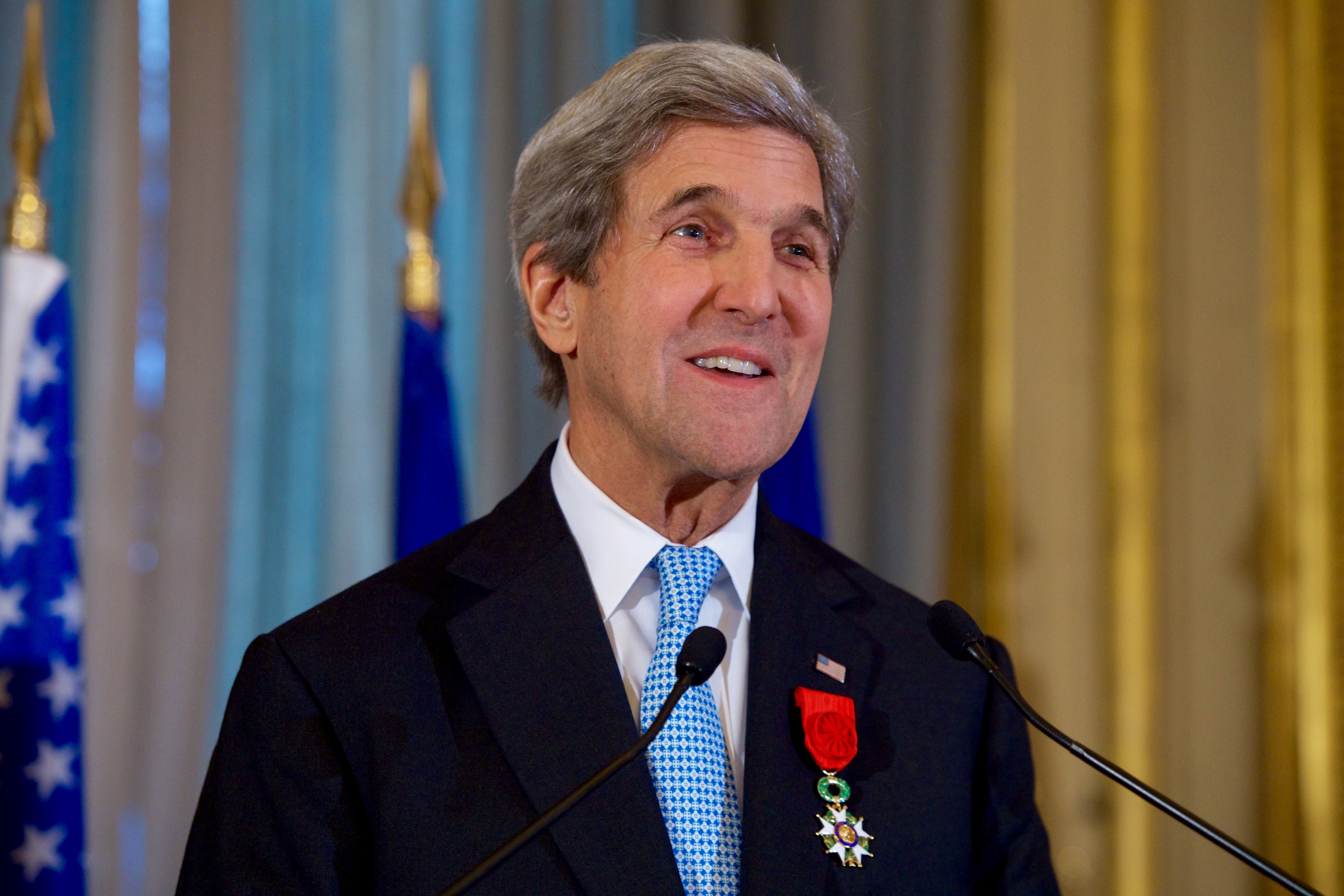
Kerry after he received Grand Officer of the Legion of Honour from French Foreign Minister Jean-Marc Ayrault

John Kerry was awarded:

=== National ===
- Presidential Medal of Freedom (3 May 2024)

=== Foreign ===
- Germany: Grand Cross 1st class of the Order of Merit of the Federal Republic of Germany (5 December 2016)
- France: Grand Officer of the National Order of the Legion of Honour (10 December 2016)
- UK: Honorary Knight Commander of the Most Distinguished Order of Saint Michael and Saint George (17 April 2025)

== Honorary degrees ==
John Kerry has received several honorary degrees in recognition of his service to the United States, These include:

State/Country	Date	School	Degree
Massachusetts	May 28, 1988	University of Massachusetts Boston	Doctor of Laws
Massachusetts	June 17, 2000	Northeastern University	Doctor of Public Service
Ohio	May 2006	Kenyon College	Doctor of Laws
Massachusetts	May 19, 2014	Boston College	Doctor of Laws
Connecticut	May 18, 2017	Yale University	Doctor of Laws
England	February 24, 2026	University of Oxford	Doctor of Laws

== Works ==
- Kerry, John; Vietnam Veterans Against the War (1971). The New Soldier. New York: Macmillan Publishing. ISBN 0-02-073610-X.
- —— (1997). The New War: The Web of Crime That Threatens America's Security. New York: Simon & Schuster. ISBN 0-684-81815-9.
- —— (2003). A Call to Service: My Vision for a Better America. New York: Viking Press. ISBN 0-670-03260-3.
- —— Heinz Kerry, Teresa (2007). This Moment on Earth: Today's New Environmentalists and Their Vision for the Future. New York: PublicAffairs. ISBN 978-1-58648-431-6.
- —— (2018). Every Day Is Extra. New York: Simon & Schuster. ISBN 9781501178955. OCLC 1028456250.

== See also ==
- List of United States Democratic Party presidential candidates
- List of United States Democratic Party presidential tickets
- List of foreign ministers in 2017

== Notes ==
Party political offices
Preceded by Thomas P. O'Neill III	Democratic nominee for Lieutenant Governor of Massachusetts; 1982	Succeeded by Evelyn Murphy
Preceded by Paul Tsongas	Democratic nominee for U.S. Senator from Massachusetts (Class 2); 1984, 1990, 1996, 2002, 2008	Succeeded by Ed Markey
Preceded by George J. Mitchell	Chair of the Democratic Senatorial Campaign Committee; 1987–1989	Succeeded by John Breaux
Preceded by Dan Inouye	Chair of the Senate Democratic Steering Committee; 1995–2003	Succeeded by Hillary Clinton
Preceded by Al Gore	Democratic nominee for President of the United States; 2004	Succeeded by Barack Obama
Political offices
Preceded by Thomas P. O'Neill III	Lieutenant Governor of Massachusetts; 1983–1985	Succeeded by Evelyn Murphy
Preceded by Hillary Clinton	United States Secretary of State; 2013–2017	Succeeded by Rex Tillerson
New office	United States Special Presidential Envoy for Climate; 2021–2024	Succeeded by John Podesta
U.S. Senate
Preceded by Paul Tsongas	U.S. Senator (Class 2) from Massachusetts; 1985–2013; Served alongside: Ted Kennedy, Paul G. Kirk, Scott Brown, Elizabeth Warren	Succeeded by Mo Cowan
New office	Chair of the Senate POW/MIA Affairs Committee; 1991–1993	Position abolished
Preceded by Dale Bumpers	Ranking Member of the Senate Small Business Committee; 1997–2001	Succeeded by Kit Bond
Preceded by Kit Bond	Chair of the Senate Small Business Committee; 2001–2003	Succeeded by Olympia Snowe
Preceded by Kit Bond	Ranking Member of the Senate Small Business Committee; 2003–2007	Succeeded by Olympia Snowe
Preceded by Olympia Snowe	Chair of the Senate Small Business Committee; 2007–2009	Succeeded by Mary Landrieu
Preceded by Joe Biden	Chair of the Senate Foreign Relations Committee; 2009–2013	Succeeded by Bob Menendez
U.S. order of precedence (ceremonial)
Preceded by Hillary Clinton as Former U.S. Secretary of State	Order of precedence of the United States as Former U.S. Secretary of State	Succeeded by Rex Tillerson as Former U.S. Secretary of State
