= James Rassman =

American soldier (born 1948)

James Rassmann (born c. 1948) is a former Los Angeles County Sheriff's Department lieutenant who served with the U.S. Army's 5th Special Forces Group in the Vietnam War in 1968 and 1969. Now a resident of the U.S. state of Oregon, he has credited U.S. Senator John Kerry with having rescued him from the Bay Hap River on March 13, 1969.

Rassman recommended Kerry for a Silver Star medal, but the two did not maintain a relationship for the following 30 years. Rassman gained national prominence during the 2004 Presidential election when he publicly denounced the Swift Boat Veterans for Truth's campaign against Kerry.

Rassman is now a retired Los Angeles County Sheriff's Department deputy sheriff and an "avid" orchid grower.

== Events in Vietnam ==
Kerry was serving in the United States Navy at the time, as lieutenant and Officer-in-Charge of Swift Boat PCF-94, which for that period primarily patrolled in the Mekong River delta. On 13 March 1969, they had completed operations, had debarked some passengers but retained others, and this squadron of five PCF boats was headed out of the river to the bay. They approached a weir (a series of poles across the river, like thousands along the shore and the shoreline of the bay, across which nets could be strung). Some of the boats hugged the shore to the left, some to the right, in order to get around. As they tried to go around, the lead boat to the left, PCF-3, was blown clear out of the water with a command detonated mine (someone was nearby to remotely detonate it). According to Sen. Kerry's account, Kerry was already injured himself, and his boat (already damaged from a second explosion) came under heavy fire, when Kerry heard "man overboard". He says that he ordered that the crew turn the boat around and return to pick up Rassmann, who had fallen off the port side or stern of PCF-94. Rassmann was for some reason unable to climb up over the cargo net near the bow of PCF-94, so Kerry pulled him on deck. The incident earned Kerry a Bronze Star with "V" Device for valor and his third Purple Heart.

== Political fallout ==
This account was disputed by three veterans who identified themselves as members of the Swift Boat Veterans for Truth but who were not involved with Kerry or the Missions they claimed to dispute. The “swift boaters” ( The campaign inspired the widely used political pejorative "swiftboating", to describe an unfair or untrue political attack.) were part of a political pac organization opposed to Kerry's Presidential candidacy. During Kerry's Presidential campaign a number of the other actual participants there during the events stepped forward to support the original account including crew members serving on the same boats as those belonging to the SBVT.

== Rassman's involvement ==
Rassman recommended Kerry for a Silver Star. Based on such an officer's recommendation, lacking testimony to the contrary, as Kerry already had this award from a previous incident, he was awarded a Bronze Star with Combat V, instead. Part of the citation read - "Lt. Kerry directed his gunners to provide suppressing fire, while from an exposed position on the bow, his arm bleeding and in pain, with disregard for his personal safety, he pulled the man aboard."

Rassmann reappeared and became a public figure just before the 2004 Iowa caucus. After having not seen Kerry for more than 30 years, he contacted the Kerry campaign and asked how he could help. He expressed that he had attempted to contact Kerry, whom he credits with saving his life, in 1984, but Kerry said he did not receive any message from Rassmann. Rassmann was a registered Republican at the time he stepped forward to contradict the Republican attack ads . He said that he voted for Democrats Jimmy Carter, Bill Clinton, Al Gore, but also Republicans Ronald Reagan and George H. W. Bush. In January 2004, Rassmann officially changed his registration to the Democratic Party. Rassmann declared his support for Kerry in the Presidential race and the Kerry campaign engineered a meeting. The surprise reunion is credited with rousing veteran support for Kerry and propelling him to a victory in the Iowa caucus and beyond.

Rassman continued to challenge the Swift Boat Veterans' account of events throughout the campaign. He traveled with Kerry on the campaign trail in May. In August 2004 he and former Senator Max Cleland, along with several other veterans and members of the U.S. Senate, attempted to hand-deliver a letter to President George W. Bush, requesting that he condemn the Swift Boat group's TV ads.

== Continued political activity ==
Rassman has stayed active in politics; in 2006 he was one of several veterans who criticized then-Senator Hillary Clinton's support of the Iraq War.
