= Anthony DiFruscia =

American politician (born 1940)

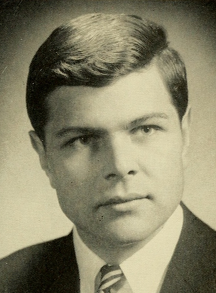
Anthony DiFruscia

Anthony DiFruscia (born June 5, 1940) is an American politician from the states of Massachusetts and New Hampshire. He served as a Democrat in the Massachusetts House of Representatives from 1967 until 1972. In 1972, DiFruscia ran for Massachusetts's 5th congressional district. However, he lost the Democratic primary to John Kerry. From 1998 until 2010, DiFruscia served in the New Hampshire House of Representatives as a Republican. In 2010, DiFruscia lost the Republican primary. DiFruscia received his BA from Emerson College and JD from New England Law Boston. He is a Roman Catholic.

Massachusetts House of Representatives
Preceded by John J. Cronin	Member of the Massachusetts House of Representatives from the 14th Essex district 1967–1969	Succeeded by Gerard A. Guilmette
Preceded by Francis Bevilacqua	Member of the Massachusetts House of Representatives from the 16th Essex district 1969–1973	Succeeded by Arthur M. Khoury
New Hampshire House of Representatives
Preceded by Debbie L. Morris	Member of the New Hampshire House of Representatives from the Rockingham 27th district 1998–2002; Served alongside: Mary E. Griffin, Janet S. Arndt	Succeeded by Constituency abolished
Preceded by Constituency established	Member of the New Hampshire House of Representatives from the Rockingham 76th district 2002–2004	Succeeded by Constituency abolished
Preceded by Constituency established	Member of the New Hampshire House of Representatives from the Rockingham 4th district 2004–2010	Succeeded by Multi-member district
