= Clara Winthrop =

American philanthropist (1876–1969)

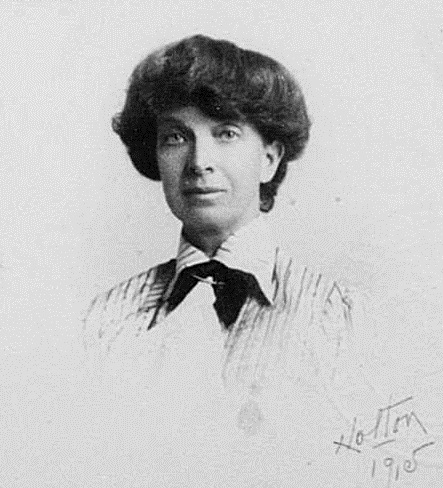
- Winthrop in 1915
- Born: Clara Bowdoin Winthrop; March 12, 1876; Boston, Massachusetts, U.S.
- Died: March 15, 1969 (aged 93); Cambridge, Massachusetts, U.S.
- Occupations: Philanthropist, art collector
- Parent(s): Robert Charles Winthrop Jr. Elizabeth Mason Winthrop
- Relatives: John Kerry (great-nephew)

Clara Bowdoin Winthrop (March 12, 1876 – March 15, 1969) was an American philanthropist, art collector, and relative of John Kerry, a U.S. Senator and former presidential candidate. She was a member of the Winthrop family.

== Life ==
Winthrop was born March 12, 1876 in Boston, Massachusetts, the older of two daughters, to Robert Charles Winthrop Jr. (1834–1905) and Elizabeth Winthrop (née Mason). She had a younger sister, Margaret Tyndal Winthrop (1880–1970), who married James Grant Forbes (1879–1955), of the Forbes family.

Her paternal grandfather was Robert C. Winthrop, hence she is a direct descendant of John Winthrop. As an adult, she was primarily known as a wealthy and childless philanthropist, funding the education of John Kerry, her sister's grandson. The Boston Globe wrote:

Among the array of relatives who looked after John, none was more important to his education than great-aunt Clara Winthrop, who had no children of her own. She owned an estate in Manchester-by-the-Sea, complete with a bowling alley inside a red barn. Winthrop offered to pay for much of John's prep school education, an expensive proposition far beyond the means of Kerry's parents. "It was a great and sweet and nice thing from an aunt who had no place to put [her money]," Kerry said. Such a gift today might be worth about $30,000 per year, given the school's typical annual cost before subsidies.

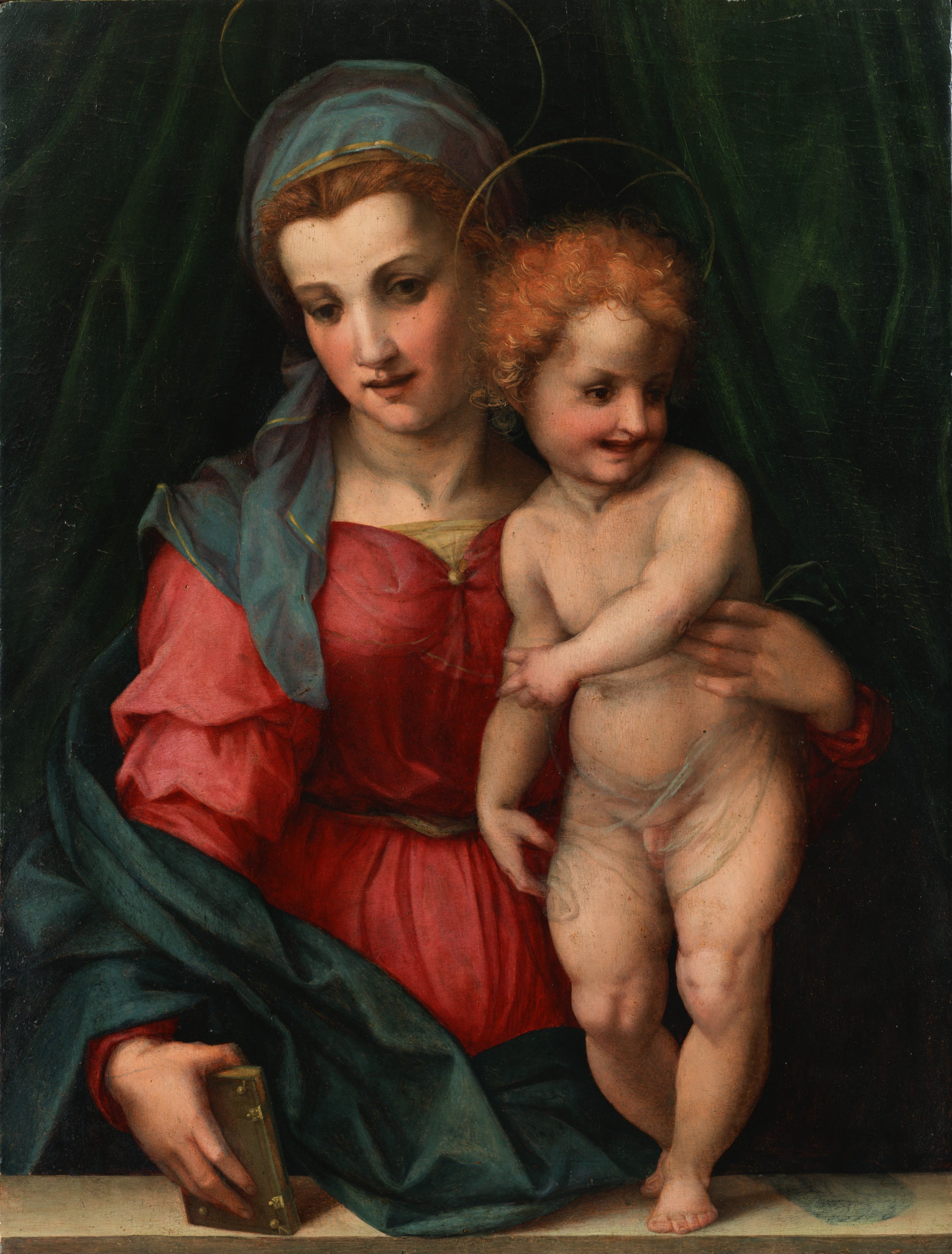
Andrea del Sarto - The Madonna and Child, now in the National Museum of Western Art, Tokyo

Winthrop was a world traveler, and is known to have visited India. While on a trip to Italy, Winthrop purchased an oil painting which was thought to be a reproduction of a work by Andrea del Sarto. In 1935 she donated the painting to the All Saints' Episcopal Church in West Newbury, Massachusetts. The painting hung over the choir stalls in an enormous gilt frame for several years until it was taken down and stored in a closet, and then in the rectory's attic. In 1999, it was discovered that the painting was not an imitation, but was The Madonna and Child by del Sarto. The painting was then sold at auction by Sotheby's for $1,102,500.

The Clara B. Winthrop Trust is named for her.

== Personal life ==
Winthrop was never married and had no children.
