= Cửa Lớn River =

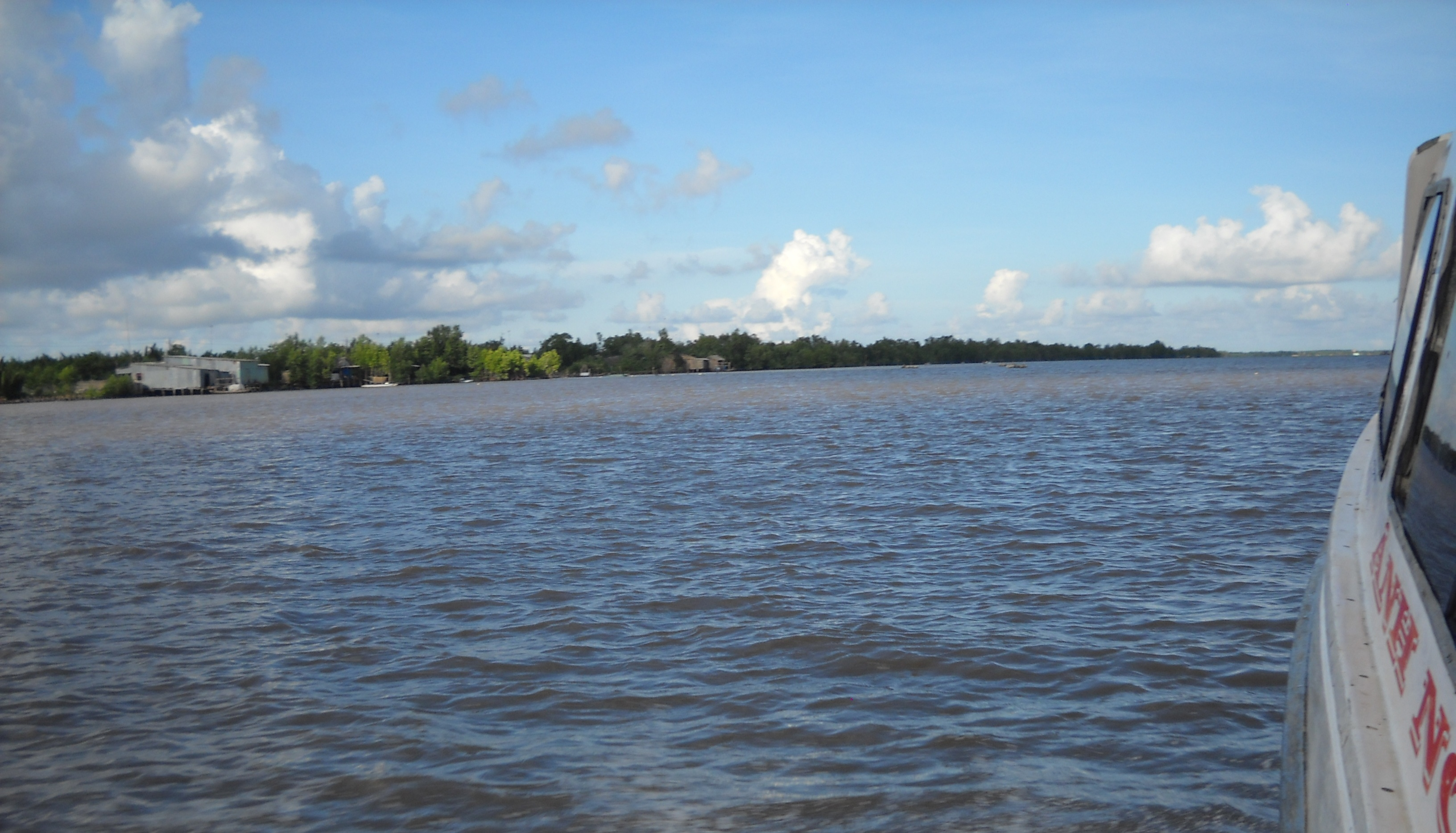

- Location within Vietnam

Location
- Country: Vietnam

Physical characteristics
- Source
  - location: Cà Mau province
- Mouth: Gulf of Thailand
  - coordinates: 8°43′35″N 104°48′18″E
- Length: 58 kilometres

The Cửa Lớn River (Vietnamese: Sông Cửa Lớn) is a river of Vietnam. The river flows through Cà Mau province for 58 kilometres.
