= August 1915 =

Month of 1915

<<	August 1915					>>
Su	Mo	Tu	We	Th	Fr	Sa
1	2	3	4	5	6	7
8	9	10	11	12	13	14
15	16	17	18	19	20	21
22	23	24	25	26	27	28
29	30	31

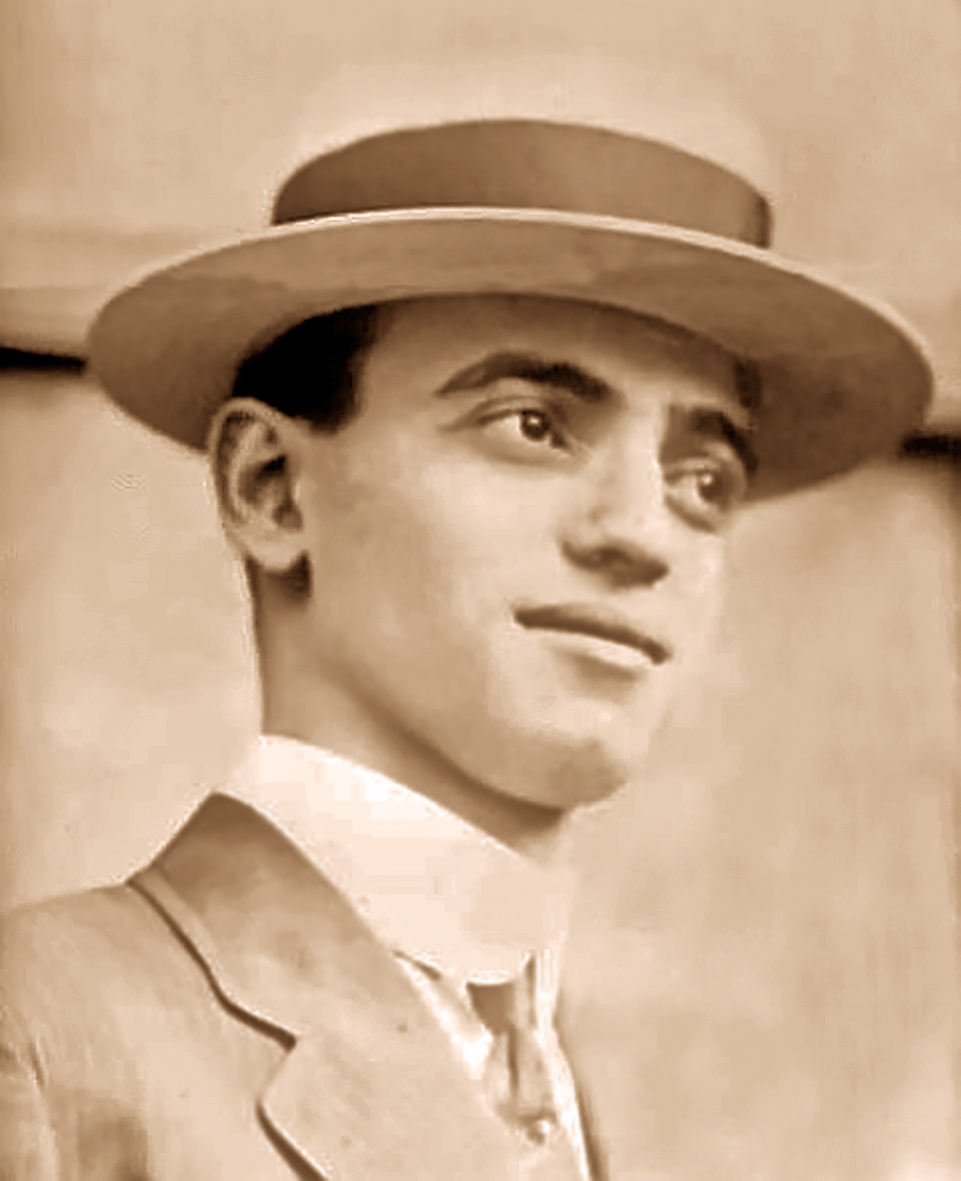
Leo Frank, convicted of murdering Mary Phagan, was lynched by a mob in Marietta, Georgia.

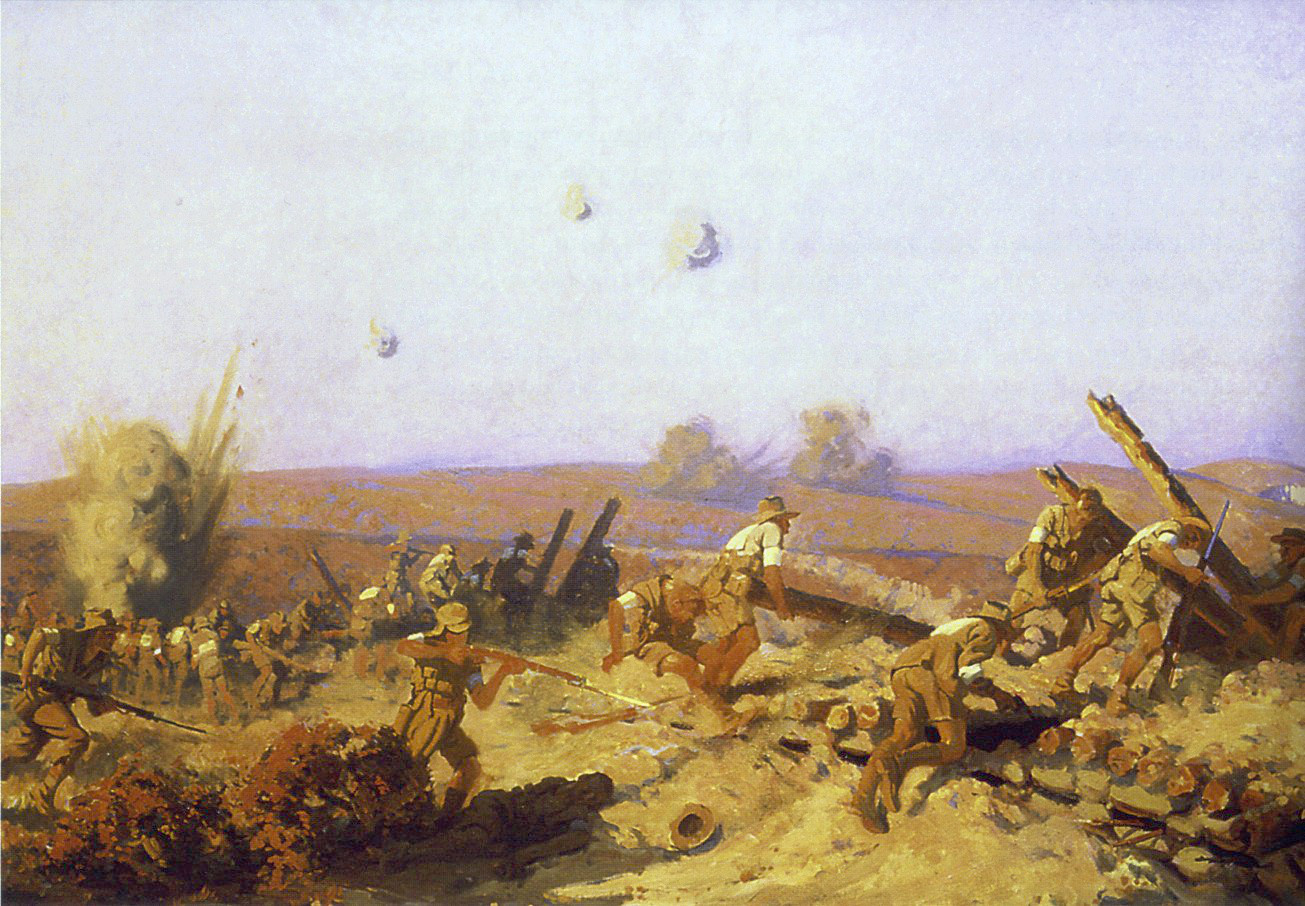
Australians troops charge the Ottoman line during the Battle of Lone Pine, painting by Fred Leist, 1921.

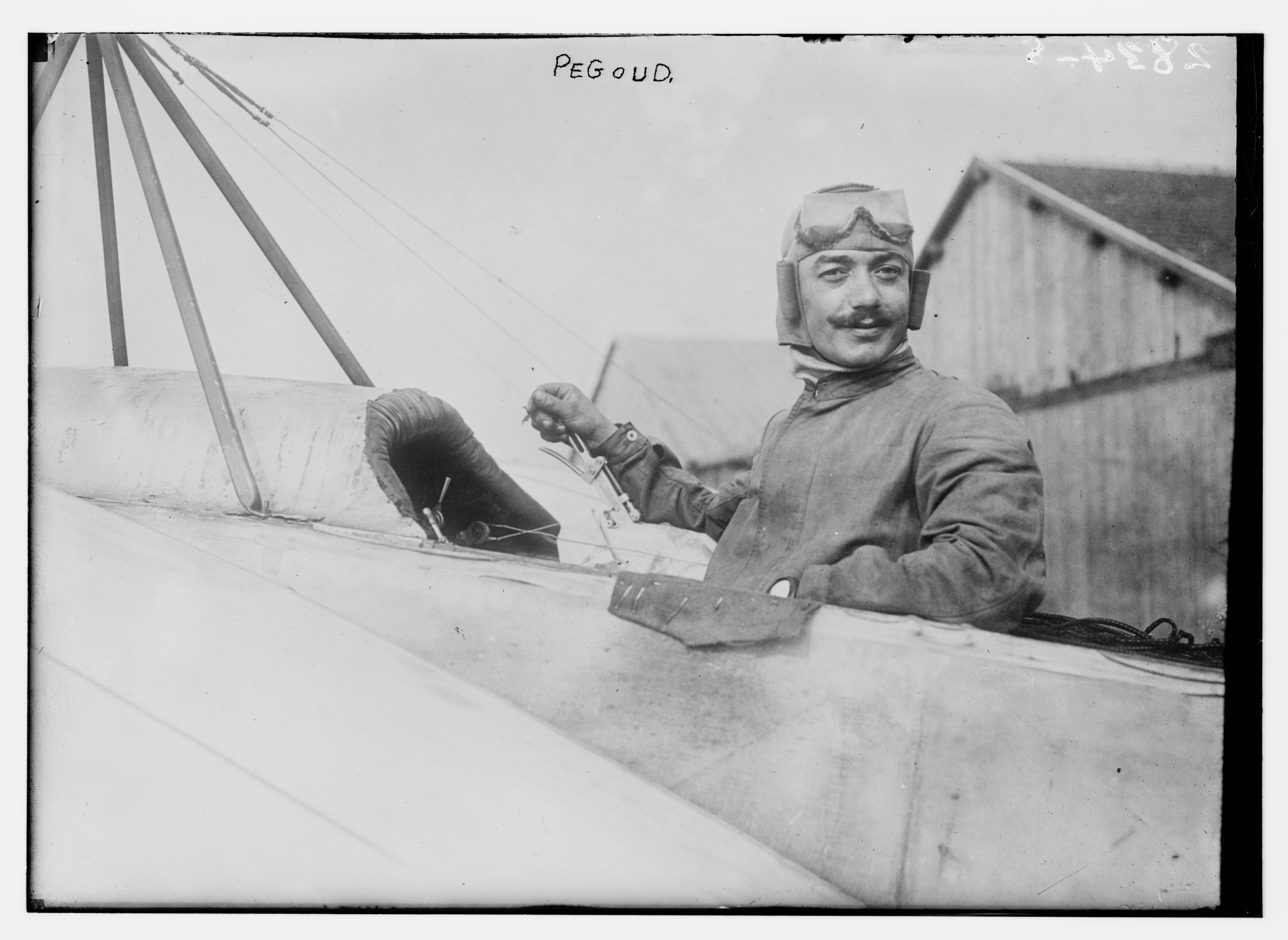
French war ace Adolphe Pégoud was killed in combat.

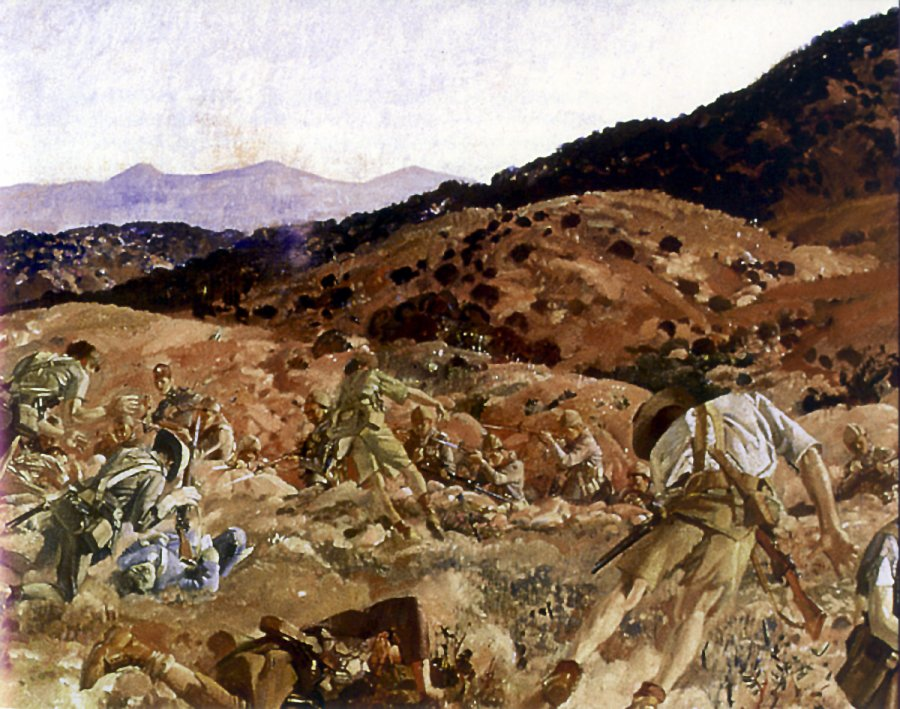
The charge of the 3rd Light Horse Brigade at the Nek, 7 August 1915, painting by George Washington Lambert, 1924.

The following events occurred in August 1915:

== August 1, 1915 (Sunday) ==
- German fighter pilot Max Immelmann shot down his first aircraft while flying in a Fokker monoplane, beginning his career as an ace.
- Irish national hero Jeremiah O'Donovan Rossa was buried at Glasnevin Cemetery in Dublin, while Irish Republican leader Patrick Pearse delivered a graveside oration containing the phrase "Ireland unfree shall never be at peace".
- Imperial Trans-Antarctic Expedition — The polar exploration ship Endurance had spent the entire Antarctic winter encased in ice far off the coast when a south-westerly gale broke up the ice floe and caused the ship to list. Expedition leader Ernest Shackleton wrote in his log, "The effects of the pressure around us was awe-inspiring ... if the ship was once gripped firmly her fate would be sealed."
- The Imperial German Army created the army group German Crown Prince to serve on the Western Front.
- The Retiro Mitre railway station opened in Buenos Aires as the end of the Mitre Railway, as one of the largest rail stations in Argentina.
- The Chosen Government Railway opened the first section of the Hamgyeong Line in Korea with stations Wonsan, Togwon, and Munchon serving the line.
- Born:
  - Mario Pantaleo, Italian Argentine priest, founder of the Obra del Padre Mario foundation that funds health and education projects in González Catán, Argentina; as José Mario Pantaleo, in Pistoia, Kingdom of Italy (present-day Italy) (d. 1992)
  - Leonard Jan Le Vann, American Canadian medical officer, head of the controversial Provincial Training School for Mental Defectives in Red Deer, Alberta from 1949 to 1974; in the United States (d. 1987)

== August 2, 1915 (Monday) ==
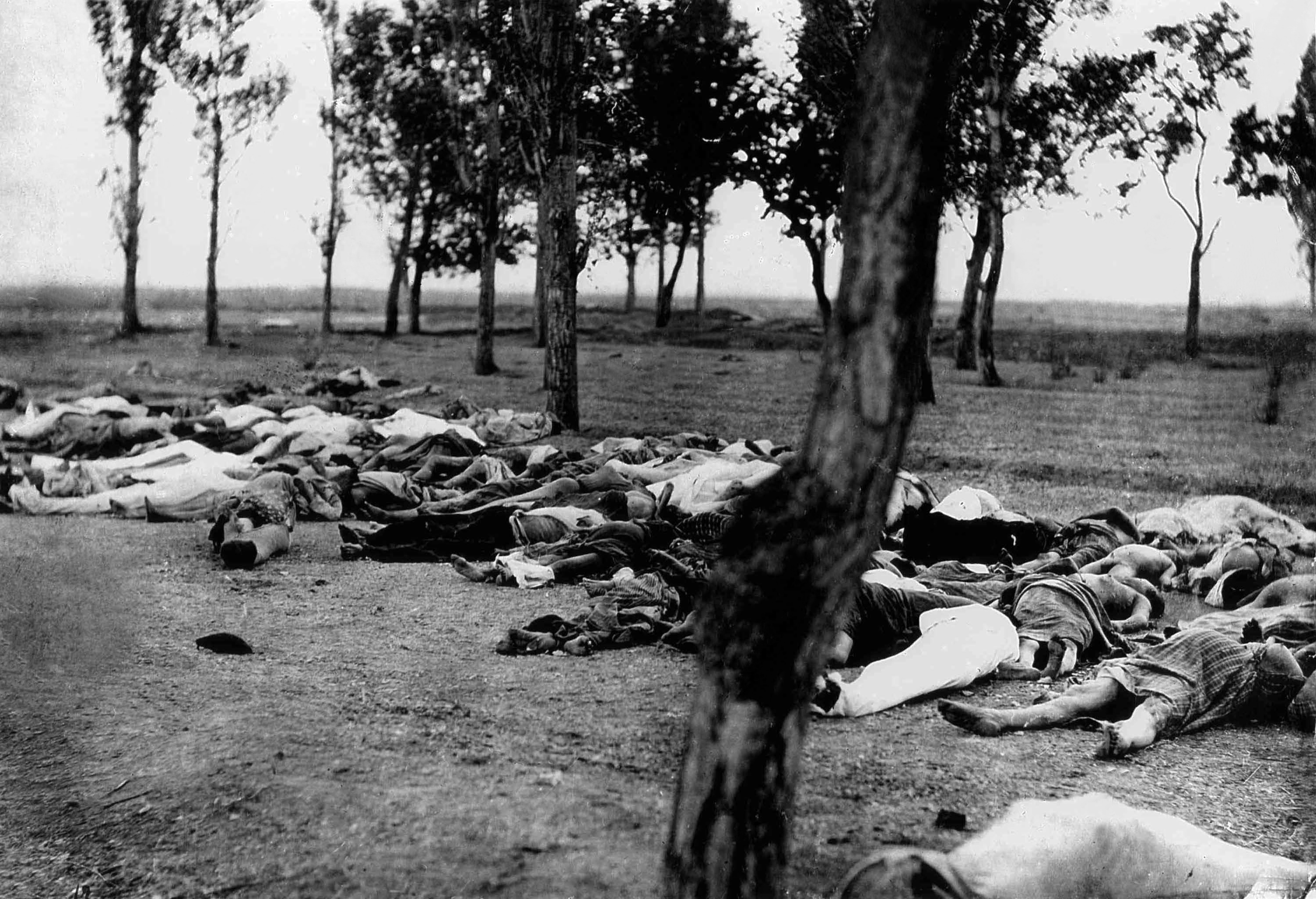
Bodies of Armenians lining the road along the way to concentration camps in Ottoman Syria during the Armenian genocide.

- Armenian genocide — American ambassador Henry Morgenthau Sr. reported to the U.S. government that during a meeting with Interior Minister Talaat Pasha, it was confirmed that the Ottoman government was pursuing a policy of deliberate and planned deportations of ethnic Armenians. Morgenthau has been collecting mounting evidence of genocide over months and admonished Pasha with the statement, "Our people will never forget these massacres."
- A Sopwith Baby airplane equipped with wheeled floats took off from sea carrier HMS Campania, the first British aircraft to do so on a British aviation ship.
- No. 5 Squadron of the Royal Air Force was established at Dover, England but was shortly absorbed into the air naval service.
- The French air squadron Escadrille 65 was established at Lyon–Bron Airport in eastern France.
- The III Cavalry Corps of the Imperial German Army was established.
- The Imperial German Army established the 86th, 88th, and 89th Infantry Divisions.
- The Batavia association football club beat the Semarang club 2–0 in the final of the DEI Championship.
- Metro Pictures released its first feature film Sealed Valley.
- The Estación Retiro subway line opened in Buenos Aires.
- Born:
  - Gary Merrill, American actor, best known for his lead role in All About Eve, husband to Bette Davis; in Hartford, Connecticut, United States (d. 1990)
  - Ruth Lilly, American philanthropist, head of the Lilly Endowment; in Indianapolis, United States (d. 2009)
- Died: John Downer, 72, Australian politician, 16th Premier of South Australia; died from cancer (b. 1843)

== August 3, 1915 (Tuesday) ==
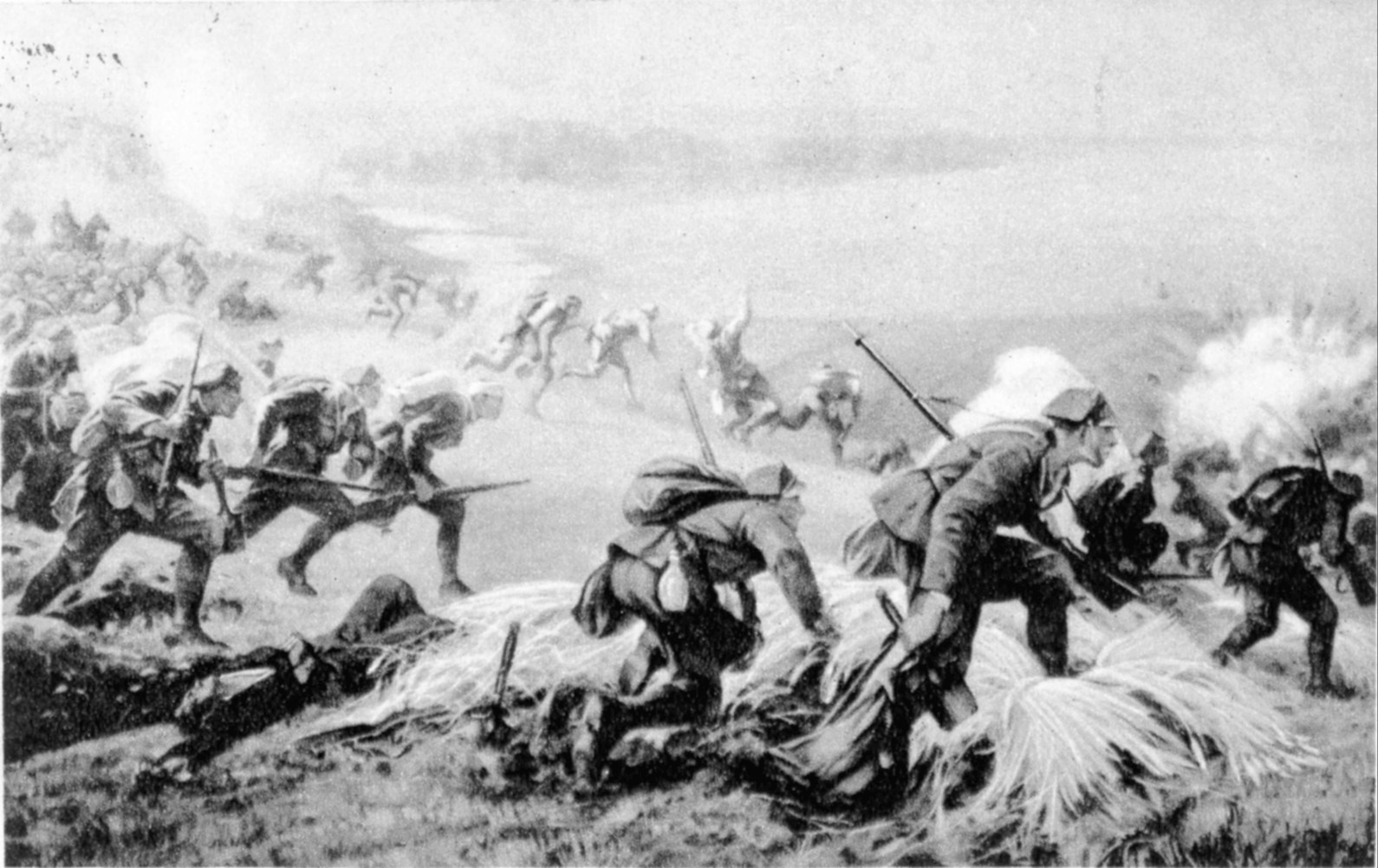
Polish infantry charge Russian lines during the Battle of Jastków in Eastern Europe.

- Second Battle of the Isonzo — Despite having superior numbers, hard terrain, low ammunition and brutal fighting forced Italy to halt its attack on Austro-Hungarian positions in the Alps. Total casualties during three weeks of fighting were about 91,000 men, of which 41,800 were Italians and 48,600 were Austro-Hungarians.
- Battle of Jastków — The Polish Legions won their first major victory against the Imperial Russian Army at the village of Jastków in what is now eastern Poland.
- A unit of 30 Texas Rangers, supported by federal troops and deputy sheriffs engaged in a shootout with Mexican-American ranch owner Aniceto Pizana who had been accused by a neighboring rancher of supporting border raiders that had been attacking border towns as the American-Mexican border. Despite no evidence, Pizana managed to shoot his way out, leaving one soldier killed and three others wounded.
- The 60th Corps of the Imperial German Army was established.
- The Women's City Club of New York was established to promote women's suffrage in New York City.
- Born:
  - Frank Arthur Calder, Canadian politician, member of the Legislative Assembly of British Columbia from 1949 to 1979, first Aboriginal to be elected to any legislature in Canada; in Nisga'a territory, British Columbia, Canada (d. 2006)
  - Helen Peterson, American activist, director of the National Congress of American Indians from 1954 to 1961; as Helen White, on the Pine Ridge Indian Reservation, South Dakota, United States (d. 2000)

== August 4, 1915 (Wednesday) ==
- British submarine HMS C33 struck a mine in the North Sea off Great Yarmouth, Norfolk, England and sank with the loss of all 16 crew.
- The International Association for Identification, currently the largest association of forensic investigators, began when the Oakland Police Department put out invitations to forensic investigators internationally to meet in Oakland, California in October and form an organization.
- The association football club Teresópolis was established in Teresópolis, Rio de Janeiro, Brazil.
- Born:
  - Luke Easter, American baseball player, first baseman for the Homestead Grays and Cleveland Indians from 1947 to 1954; as Luscious Easter, in Jonestown, Coahoma County, Mississippi, United States (murdered, 1979)
  - Donald Dean Summerville, Canadian politician, 53rd Mayor of Toronto; in Toronto, Canada (d. 1963)

== August 5, 1915 (Thursday) ==
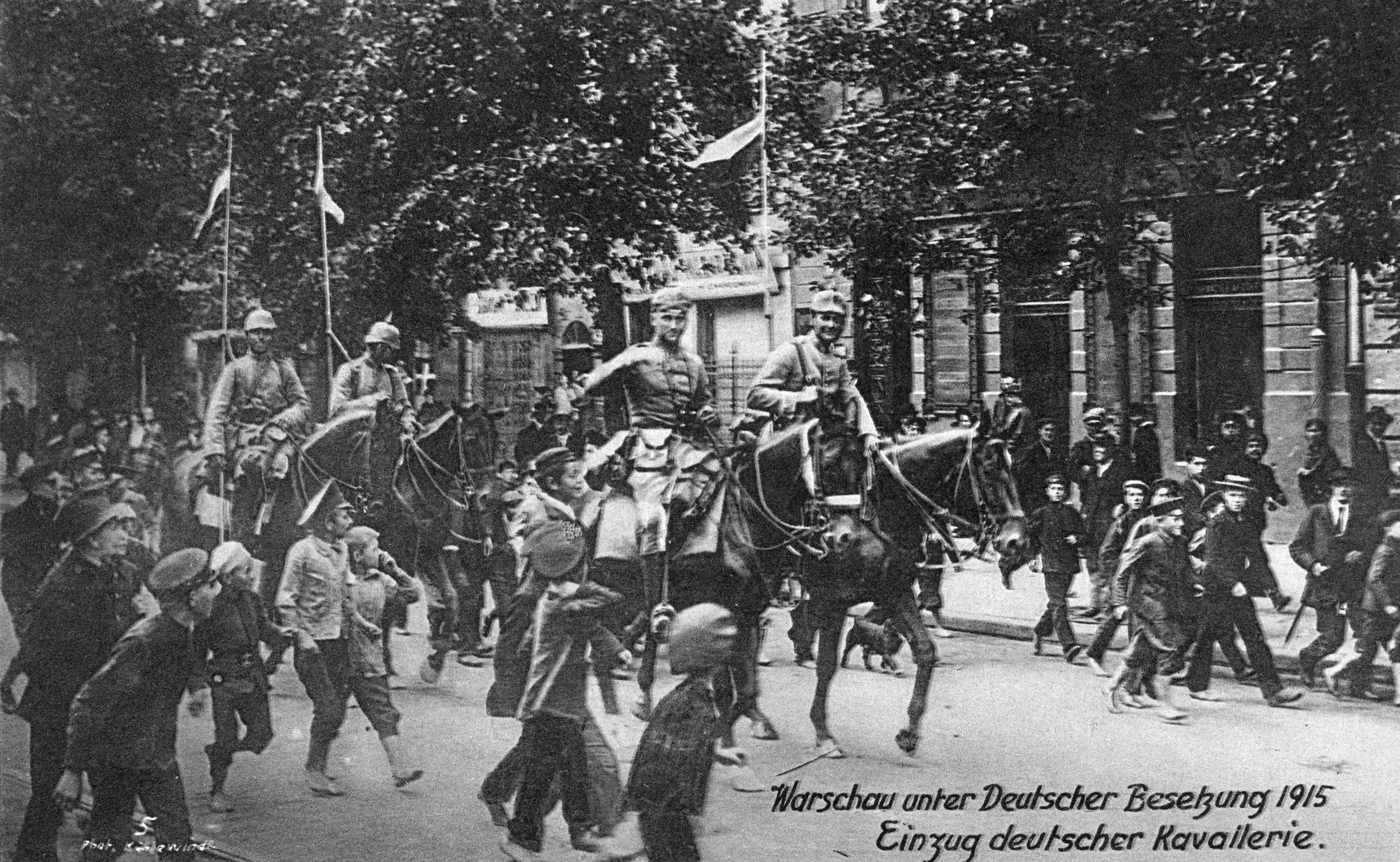
German cavalry entering Warsaw on August 5, 1915, during the Great Retreat in the Russian Empire.

- Great Retreat — The Imperial Russian Army abandoned Warsaw, allowing the German forces to occupy it with little resistance.
- A second hurricane began to form in the Atlantic Ocean east of the Caribbean.
- Italian submarine Nereide was torpedoed and sunk in the Adriatic Sea by Austro-Hungarian sub SM U-5 with the loss of all 19 crew.
- The German freighter Aenne Rickmers, captured by the British, was outfitted as a seaplane carrier and commissioned as HMS Anne for operations in the Mediterranean Sea.
- The Imperial German Army created the army groups Hindenburg and Prince Leopold to serve on the Eastern Front.
- The Nishio Railway extended the Nishio Line in the Aichi Prefecture, Japan, with station Kami Yokosuka serving the line.
- The musical The Blue Paradise by Edmund Eysler, Sigmund Romberg and Leo Edwards premiered on Broadway at the Casino Theatre in New York City, resulting in a successful run of 356 performances.
- Born:
  - Mildred Burke, American wrestler, pioneering women wrestler and holder of the NWA World Women's Championship belt for 20 years; as Mildred Bliss, in Coffeyville, Kansas, United States (d. 1989)
  - Helmut Wick, German air force officer, commander of Jagdgeschwader 2 for the Luftwaffe of Nazi Germany during World War II, recipient of the Knight's Cross of the Iron Cross; in Mannheim, German Empire (present-day Germany) (killed in action, 1945)
- Died: Sakuma Samata, 70, Japanese army officer, 5th Governor-General of Taiwan (b. 1844)

== August 6, 1915 (Friday) ==
- Landing at Suvla Bay — Reinforcement divisions from the British IX Corps under command of General Frederick Stopford landed at Suvla as part of a new offensive on the Gallipoli peninsula.
- Battle of Krithia Vineyard — The 88th Brigade of the British 29th Division launched the first attack wave on defense positions held by four Ottoman divisions on the Gallipoli peninsula as part of a diversionary tactic while reinforcements landed at Suvla.
- Battle of Lone Pine — An Australian brigade of 1,800 men assaulted Ottoman trenches on a slope nicknamed for the solitary Turkish pine tree that stood atop of it as part of the second diversionary tactic to distract the Ottomans from the landing at Suvla. The Ottomans covered the trenches with pine boards that made it difficult for the Australian infantry to capture on the first day of fighting.
- Battle of Sari Bair — The ANZAC forces mounted a diversionary attack timed to coincide with a major Allied landing of reinforcements at Suvla and to capture the Sari Bair range overlooking the bay.
- Attack of the Dead Men — A German force of over 7,000 men, under Paul von Hindenburg, launched a chlorine gas bombardment on the Russian garrison of Osowiec Fortress. Expecting little resistance, the advancing German forces panicked and routed when a small group of Russian defenders launched a counterattack. Their zombie-like appearance, due to the gas damage, earned the battle its name.
- Bernardino Machado succeeded Teófilo Braga to become the third President of Portugal. His term would barely last two years before he was deposed and exiled by Sidónio Pais in 1917.
- General elections were held in Manitoba after the Lieutenant Governor of Manitoba called for them following the resignation of Premier Rodmond Roblin in May. The Manitoba Liberal Party defeated the incumbent Progressive Conservative Party of Manitoba in a massive landslide, gaining 40 of the 47 seats in the Legislative Assembly of Manitoba while the Conservatives were reduced to five seats.
- Border raiders attacked the border town of Sebastian, Texas, killing local former lawman A. L. Austin and his son Charles. Authorities believed the raiders targeted him specifically for his record of targeting Mexican-Americans during his days as a law enforcer.
- Weather and communications problems frustrated reconnaissance efforts by German Navy airships in support of mine-laying mission by auxiliary cruiser SMS Meteor. The lack of information proved to have dire consequences, when the German ship was intercepted by the Royal Navy and forced the crew to scuttle her.
- Ross Sea party — British polar ship Aurora, still drifting in the ice of the Southern Ocean, was now 360 nautical miles (670 km) north of Cape Evans where much of the expedition was marooned.
- The Naval General Service Medal was created to recognize efforts by the Royal Navy and Royal Marines for campaigns that otherwise would not be recognized by other British military decorations. It was replaced by the General Service Medal in 1962.
- The daily newspaper Dainik Basumati began publication in Calcutta, and would continue until folding in 2003.
- Died:
  - Guido Goldschmiedt, 65, Austrian chemist, best known for determining the structure of papaverine to be used for pharmaceutical treatment (b. 1850)
  - Benjamin F. Tracy, 85, American politician, 32nd United States Secretary of the Navy (b. 1830)

== August 7, 1915 (Saturday) ==
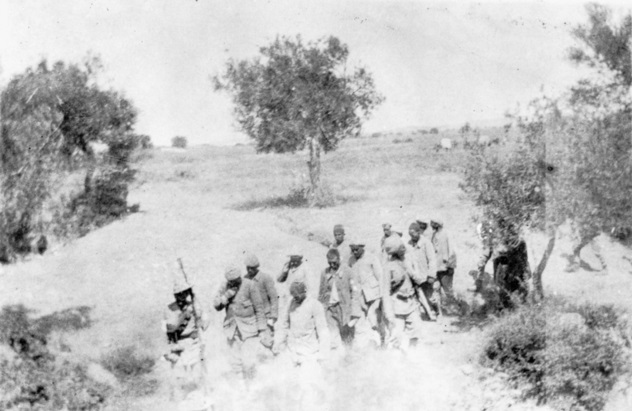
Turkish POWs being escorted in Chunuk Bair, Gallipoli.

- Landing at Suvla Bay — The landing of British reinforcement divisions at Suvla Bay became disorganized due to a breakdown in the chain of command, poor briefings among officers and soldiers, and Ottoman snipers shooting commanding officers to further increase confusion.
- Battle of Krithia Vineyard — The British 42nd Division launched the second attack wave on Ottoman defenses to the right of the 88th Brigade of the British 29th Division. One of the brigades managed to break through the Ottoman line but failed to hold the ground to counterattack. Losses in the first 24 hours of attacks from the 88th Brigade and two brigades from the 42nd Division totaled 3,469.
- Battle of Lone Pine — Three Ottoman reinforcements began a three-day counter-offensive to take back trenches captured by Australian forces.
- Battle of Chunuk Bair — An ANZAC force between 9,000 and 15,000 men under command of Alexander Godley attacked the northern flank of Ottoman Empire defenses that held the Sari Bair Range in Gallipoli. Although the force was successful in clearing defending outposts, the attack fell behind in schedule and contributed to tragic losses at the Battle of the Nek. By evening, ANZAC forces had hunkered down to hold their ground instead of advancing on the Ottoman line.
- Battle of the Nek — Two regiments with the Australian 3rd Light Horse Brigade totaling 600 men mounted a bayonet charge on Ottoman defenses situated on a ridge nicknamed the 'Nek', an Afrikaans word for mountain pass, as part of the Battle of Chunuk Bair. Because the terrain created a bottleneck, delays at Chunuk Bair prevented early reinforcements. As the rifles were also unloaded, the attacking Australians lost 372 casualties, or 40 per cent of the force while the Ottomans recorded only eight casualties.
- The German 12th Army was established for the Eastern Front but would be dissolved about a year later.
- The Drybridge Platform railway station in Scotland was closed as part of wartime measures.
- Russian astronomer Grigory Neujmin discovered minor planet 916 America at the Simeiz Observatory in Simeiz, Russian Empire.

== August 8, 1915 (Sunday) ==
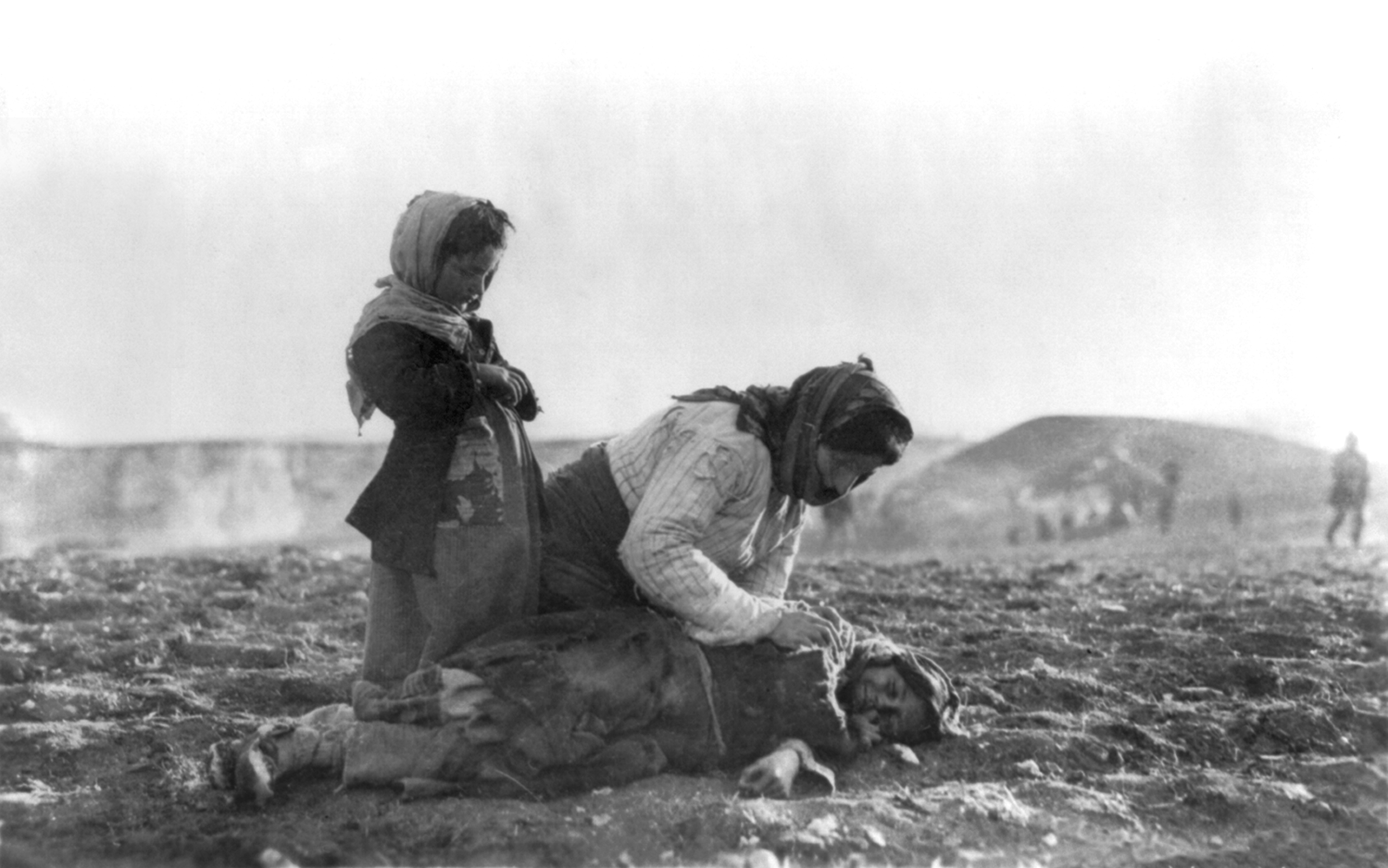
An Armenian woman kneeling beside a dead child in a field "within sight of help and safety at Aleppo."

- Armenian genocide — Reports began to come out of Ottoman Syria that Armenians were dying by the thousands from starvation and sickness during forced marches to a network of 25 camps surrounding the town of Deir ez-Zor. The New York Times published an unattributed report that "the roads and the Euphrates are strewn with corpses of exiles, and those who survive are doomed to certain death. It is a plan to exterminate the whole Armenian people."
- Landing at Suvla Bay — General Ian Hamilton, commander of the Mediterranean Expeditionary Force during the Gallipoli campaign, met with General Frederick Stopford and noted the landing was going too slowly, allowing Ottoman forces to reorganize their defenses. He pushed Stopford to order a march on Ottoman defenses 12 hours sooner than planned.
- Battle of Chunuk Bair — A New Zealand battalion of 760 men under command of William George Malone attempted but failed to hold a captured hill from Ottoman counterattacks, resulting in 711 casualties including Malone.
- Battle of the Gulf of Riga — The German High Seas Fleet attempted to clear Russian minefields around the Gulf of Riga in the Baltic Sea in an attempt to destroy the Baltic Fleet and facilitate the German capture of the Russian port of Riga (now Latvia).
- Ottoman battleship Barbaros Hayreddin, formerly the SMS Kurfürst Friedrich Wilhelm, was torpedoed and sunk in the Sea of Marmara off Bolayır, Turkey by British submarine HMS E11 with the loss of 253 of her 568 crew.
- British armed merchant cruiser SS India was torpedoed and sunk in the Norwegian Sea off Bodø, Nordland, Norway by German submarine SM U-22 with the loss of 160 of the 311 people on board.
- Raid on Norias Ranch — A motley group of 17 men composed of Texas Rangers and local peace officers held off a raid of 60 Carrancista rebels on a ranch near Kingsville, Texas, resulting in seven killed and 14 wounded. The raid was part of the Plan of San Diego, a rebel campaign to create unrest on the Texas-Mexican border.
- Austro-Hungarian submarine SM U-12 struck a mine and sank in the Venetian Lagoon with the loss of all 17 crew, the first Austro-Hungarian submarine lost during World War I.
- British armed boarding steamer SS The Ramsey was torpedoed and sunk in the North Sea by German auxiliary cruiser SMS Meteor.
- The Catholic Centre Party was established in Portugal with a single seat already won during the 1915 parliamentary elections.
- The Saku Railway opened stations Ariake, Nakagomi, Onara, Kubo, Iwamurada, Nakasato, and Otome to serve the Ōito rail line in the Nagano Prefecture, Japan.
- Bishop James Duhig dedicated the Mount Carmel Convent in Wynnum, Queensland, Australia. It was added to the Queensland Heritage Register in 1999.
- The Manchester Bridge spanning the Allegheny River opened in Pittsburgh. It was replaced by the Fort Duquesne Bridge in 1969.
- Born: Sam Stoller, American track athlete, competitor for the American relay team during the 1936 Summer Olympics when he and Marty Glickman were suddenly excluded, champion of the Big Ten Conference and National Collegiate Athletic Association in 1937; as Samuel Stoller, in Cincinnati, United States (d. 1985)
- Died:
  - Albert Downing, 29, New Zealand rugby player, forward for the New Zealand national rugby union team and the Marist Brothers Old Boys RFC in 1913–14; killed in action at the Battle of Chunuk Bair (b. 1886)
  - William George Malone, 56, New Zealand army officer, commander of the Wellington Infantry Battalion during the Gallipoli Campaign; killed in action at the Battle of Chunuk Bair (b. 1859)

== August 9, 1915 (Monday) ==
- Armenian genocide — Swedish diplomat Cossva Anckarsvärd, stationed in Constantinople, released a report stating his suspicions of genocide in July were confirmed: "It is obvious that the Turks are taking the opportunity to, now during the war, annihilate the Armenian nation so that when the peace comes no Armenian question longer exists."
- Landing at Suvla Bay — Forced to march two miles in rough terrain in darkness, the British infantry of the 32nd Brigade were too exhausted to fight off a surprise bayonet charge by the Ottomans. The brigade was destroyed within minutes and the battalions coming up the rear were forced to retreat.
- Battle of Lone Pine — Fighting between Australian and Ottoman forces subsided after three days of intense hand-to-hand combat, as both sides consolidated their lines along the slope.
- Battle of Chunuk Bair — British forces were ordered to capture a strategic hill codenamed "Hill Q" during the night, but most of the forces were disoriented in the dark and failed to reach the objective. One Indian brigade that did reach it was hit by friendly fire and forced to retreat.
- British destroyer HMS Lynx struck a mine and sank in the North Sea. Out of the 100 crewmen on board, there were only 26 survivors.
- German auxiliary cruiser SMS Meteor was scuttled in the North Sea. All on board were rescued by Royal Navy cruisers.
- The Brooklyn Rapid Transit Company completed the BMT Myrtle Avenue Line in Queens with the addition of stations Fresh Pond Road, Forest Avenue, and Seneca Avenue.
- Rail stations Aultmore in London and Buckie, Enzie, and Gretna, Portessie, and Rathven in Scotland were closed as part of wartime measures.
- Died:
  - Henry Dewar, 31, New Zealand rugby player, forward for the New Zealand national rugby union team, and the Taranaki and Wellington rugby football unions; killed in action at the Battle of Chunuk Bair (b. 1883)
  - Norman Frederick Hastings, 36, New Zealand army officer, recipient of the Distinguished Service Order and the Legion of Honour; died from wounds sustained at the Battle of Sari Bair (b. 1879)
  - Jerzy Żuławski, 41, Polish writer, author of The Lunar Trilogy; died from typhus (b. 1874)

== August 10, 1915 (Tuesday) ==
- 1915 Galveston hurricane – A tropical storm that had formed in the middle of the Atlantic Ocean five days earlier strengthened to a Category 1 hurricane when it was first observed north of Barbados.
- Battle of Lone Pine — Fighting ended in a stalemate between the Australian and Ottoman infantry, with Australian casualties at 2,277 men killed or wounded, while Ottoman estimates were estimated between 5,000 and 6,000. While the battle was considered a defeat, it gave Australian forces higher recognition among international military organizations, with the awarding of seven Victoria Crosses to individual Australian soldiers.
- Battle of Chunuk Bair — A brutal Ottoman counter-assault overwhelmed 5,000 British and ANZAC defenders on a plateau code named "The Farm," forcing them to give up the area. The exhausted Ottoman force withdraw and the plateau became part of no man's land.
- A German army of 80,000 troops lay siege to fortified Russian troops in Novogeorgievsk, Russian Empire (now Poland).
- Five German Navy Zeppelin airships raided England, destroying houses and warehouses and killing 16 people. Four of the airships attempted to bomb London, but failed to reach the city. Instead, they dropped their payload at the Eastchurch Naval Air Station in Dover, injuring three men. One of the airships was damaged by an antiaircraft gun and brought down in the North Sea on its way home. It was towed into Ostend, Belgium by a German torpedo boat.
- The 29th, 30th, and 32nd Battalions of the First Australian Imperial Force were established to serve in Gallipoli.
- Ross Sea party — British polar ship Aurora was now 45 nautical miles (83 km) north-east of Cape Adare, Antarctic and that its daily drift was averaging just over 20 nautical miles (37 km).
- An annular solar eclipse occurred in the south Pacific Ocean.
- Born: Keith B. McCutcheon, American Marine pilot, commander of the 1st Marine Aircraft Wing during the Korean War, recipient of the Distinguished Flying Cross and 10 Air Medals; in East Liverpool, Ohio, United States (d. 1971)
- Died: Henry Moseley, 27, British physicist, developed Moseley's law that provided experimental evidence to support the Bohr model for atomic structures; killed in action during the Gallipoli campaign (b. 1887)

== August 11, 1915 (Wednesday) ==
- Armenian genocide — The Ottoman government began to massacre 2,345 intellectuals being held at Çankırı and Ayaş around Ankara. Among those who perished during the massacre included:
  - Dikran Chökürian, writer and editor
  - Armen Dorian, poet
  - Parunak Ferukhan, musician
  - Melkon Giurdjian, writer and academic
  - Ardashes Harutiunian, poet and literary critic
  - Diran Kelekian, academic
  - Karekin Khajag, journalist
  - Garabed Pashayan Khan, physician
  - Shavarsh Krissian, athlete and sports journalist
  - Levon Larents, novelist
  - Kegham Parseghian, journalist
  - Smpad Piurad, writer and activist
  - Jacques Sayabalian, writer
  - Vartkes Serengülian, politician
  - Ruben Sevak, poet
  - Parsegh Shahbaz, lawyer and politician
  - Harutiun Shahrigian, politician
  - Siamanto, Armenian poet
  - Hagop Terzian, chemist and historian
  - Haig Tiriakian, politician
  - Krikor Torosian, writer
  - Daniel Varoujan, poet
- 1915 Galveston hurricane – A weather station in San Juan, Puerto Rico recorded a 29.60 inHg (1,002 mb) pressure reading and winds speeds up to 60 mph (97 km/h) as the eye of the hurricane passed south of the Virgin Islands and Puerto Rico. It continued westward between 18 and 20 mph (29 and 32 km/h) where it brushed Haiti and made landfall in Jamaica, where a barometric pressure reading of 29.68 inches of mercury (1,005 mb) was reported. There were no reports of casualties but local crop damage by the storm was very serious.
- Died: Alfred Shout, 33, New Zealand-born Australian soldier, posthumous recipient of the Victoria Cross; died from wounds received at the Battle of Lone Pine (b. 1882)

== August 12, 1915 (Thursday) ==
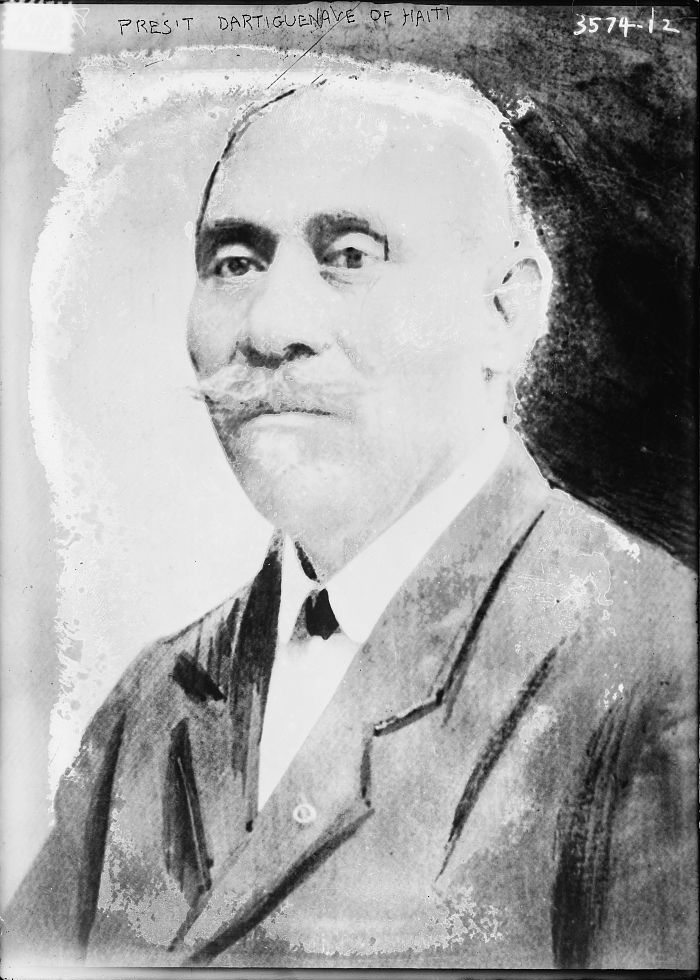
Philippe Sudré Dartiguenave, President of Haiti

- Philippe Sudré Dartiguenave became President of Haiti, easing two weeks of political turmoil in the country following the lynching of the previous president Vilbrun Guillaume Sam and the start of the United States occupation of Haiti. His alliance with the United States led to a period of stability in Haiti.
- Royal Naval Air Service pilot Charles Edmonds became the first pilot to attack a ship with an air-launched torpedo, dropping a 5,000-ton bomb on a Turkish supply ship during the Gallipoli campaign.
- The 5th Battalion of the British Royal Norfolk Regiment, composed of 250 men, "disappeared" during a failed attack on Ottoman defenses by the 54th Infantry Division during the Gallipoli campaign. Some accounts had the force march into a mist on a ridge and not be seen again. Speculations varied on their fate ranging from being captured and executed by Ottoman soldiers to supernatural events, but military investigators accounted for many of the survivors, with some making it back to the British lines while others were captured by Ottoman forces.
- Four German Navy airships attempted to bomb England, but two fell short of the coast, while the third bombed Harwich and destroyed two houses, The fourth got caught in violent thunderstorms over the North Sea and nearly came down.
- Engineering firm Black & Veatch was established in Kansas City, Missouri.
- Born:
  - Michael Kidd, American choreographer, best known for his choreography in film musicals Seven Brides for Seven Brothers and The Band Wagon; as Milton Greenwald, in New York City, United States (d. 2007)
  - Alex Wojciechowicz, American football player, linebacker for the Detroit Lions and Philadelphia Eagles from 1938 to 1950, two-time NFL champion 1948 and 1949; in South River, New Jersey, United States (d. 1992)

== August 13, 1915 (Friday) ==
- Battle of Krithia Vineyard — Fighting subsided between British and Ottoman forces with the British unable to gain any new ground. The British lost in excess of 4,000 casualties while Ottoman casualties were estimated to be around 7,000.
- British troopship HMT Royal Edward was torpedoed and sunk in the Mediterranean Sea off Greece by German submarine SM UB-14 with the loss of 935 of the 1,596 people on board.
- British ocean liner Campania was driven ashore at Galveston, Texas during the a massive hurricane. She was refloated on August 21.
- French destroyer Bisson attacked and sunk Austro-Hungarian submarine SM U-3 with the loss of seven of the sub's 21-man crew.
- Major Hüseyin Avni Bey, commander of 57th Infantry Regiment during the Gallipoli campaign, was killed when a shell hit his command post.
- Sports club Hammarby established its own association football department in Södermalm, Sweden.
- Died: George Joseph Smith, 43, English serial killer, convicted for the slaying of three women in the "Brides in the Bath Murders"; executed (b. 1872)

== August 14, 1915 (Saturday) ==
- Landing at Suvla Bay — Frustrated by General Frederick Stopford's indecisiveness to act quickly as casualties mounted by aggressive Ottoman defense maneuvers, Gallipoli campaign commander General Ian Hamilton cabled Field Marshal Herbert Kitchener and requested a change of command.
- 1915 Galveston hurricane – The hurricane intensified to a Category 4 when it brushed past Cuba, with wind speeds of 145 mph (233 km/h). Damage was reported as severe, particularly for the town of Cape San Antonio, Cuba. The hurricane also destroyed a lighthouse and all of the weather equipment belonging the National Weather Service, and damaged or sank two schooners offshore. Because of lack of advanced reporting, the death toll in Cuba was unknown.
- A rail crash in Weedon, England killed ten people.
- The prototype of the Royal Aircraft Factory B.E.9 model was first flown at Farnborough Airport, England but did not go into wide production.
- Danish pharmaceutical Lundbeck started out a trading company in Copenhagen. It shifted its focus to pharmaceutical products by 1926.
- Born: Irene Hickson, American baseball player, catcher for the All-American Girls Professional Baseball League from 1943 to 1951; in Chattanooga, Tennessee, United States (d. 1995)
- Died: James Harbottle Boyd, 57, British Hawaiian military officer, last military official for the Hawaiian Kingdom before it was overthrown in 1893 (b. 1858)

== August 15, 1915 (Sunday) ==
- 1915 Galveston hurricane – The hurricane had reached the center of the Gulf of Mexico when it turned northwards towards the U.S. coast. Most of the casualties from the hurricane occurred around this time as ships were caught on the outer edges of the massive storm. Most notably, the hurricane sank the U.S. steamer Marowjine in the Yucatán Channel, drowning all 96 passengers and crew. Another three fatalities were reported when a schooner sank several miles south of Mobile, Alabama, and two fishermen were killed when their fishing boat ran aground off the coast of Pensacola, Florida. In all, the hurricane left 101 people dead in the Gulf of Mexico and Yucatán Channel.
- Landing at Suvla Bay — Lieutenant-general Frederick Stopford, commander of the landing at Suvla, was sacked and replaced with Lieutenant-general Julian Byng (with Major-General Beauvoir De Lisle as interim commander while Byng was traveling from his previous post in France.
- Armenian genocide — Ottoman troops began massacring 400 ethnic Armenians around Urfa, Turkey, leading to an armed resistance.
- German submarine SM UB-4 was shelled and sunk in the North Sea off Lowestoft, Suffolk, England by HM Armed Smack Inverlyon with the loss of all 14 crew.
- Russian minelayer Ladoga struck a mine and sank in the Baltic Sea off Sweden with the loss of five of her crew.
- A party of armed Senussi fired on a British submarine investigating reported military maneuvers near the coastal village of Sollum, Egypt. General John Maxwell, commander of British forces in Egypt, accepted an explanation from Senussi leaders that the party mistook the sub as an Italian boat, assuming it was a provocation to force Senussi to attack targets on the Egyptian coast and interior.
- The British Army established the elite infantry Guards Division in Lumbres, France to serve the Western Front, starting with the 3rd Guards Brigade.
- A second rail station was built in Nishi-ku, Yokohama to extend Japan's first rail line while the original in Naka-ku was renamed Sakuragichō Station. As well, the Nippō Main Line was extended in the Ōita Prefecture, Japan with stations Shitanoe and Usuki serving the line.
- The association football club Alecrim was formed in Natal, Rio Grande do Norte, Brazil by a group of youths that included future Brazilian president Café Filho.

== August 16, 1915 (Monday) ==
- The Allies promised the Kingdom of Serbia, should victory be achieved over Austria-Hungary and its allied Central Powers, the territories of Baranja, Srem and Slavonia from the Cisleithanian part of the Dual Monarchy, along with Bosnia and Herzegovina, and eastern Dalmatia from the Krka River to Bar.
- Battle of the Gulf of Riga — German battleships SMS Nassau and Posen led over 30 torpedo boats to breach Russian naval defenses in the Baltic Sea gulf but lost a destroyer and a minesweeper during the attack.
- 1915 Galveston hurricane — The centre of the hurricane approached the east coast of Texas.
- The first edition of the daily newspaper El Rancagüino was published in Rancagua, Chile.
- Franz Joseph I of Austria established the military decoration War Cross for Civil Merits for military officers who serve with distinction outside of combat roles during World War I.
- The comic strip Freckles and His Friends by cartoonist Merrill Blosser debuted through the daily newspapers circulated by the Newspaper Enterprise Association.
- The Hindenburg Bridge that spanned the Rhine river between Rüdesheim am Rhein and Bingen am Rhein, Germany was completed and opened. The bridge was destroyed by Allied bombing in World War II.
- The Powell Bridge in Powell, Missouri opened to traffic. It became part of the National Register of Historic Places in 2014.
- Died: Kálmán Széll, 72, Hungarian state leader, 13th Prime Minister of Hungary (b. 1843)

== August 17, 1915 (Tuesday) ==
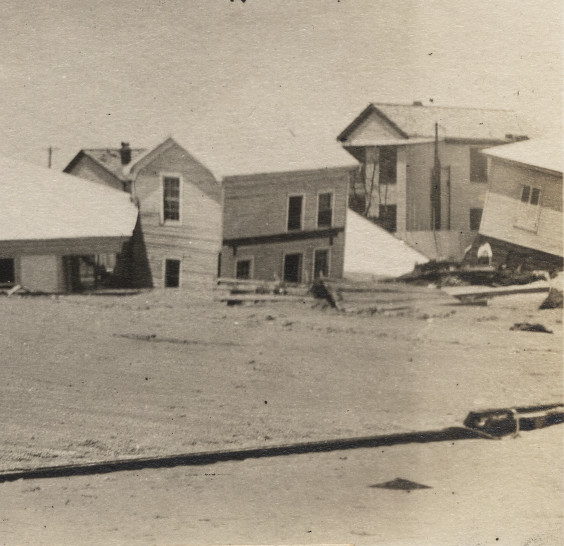
Damaged houses in Galveston, Texas following a hurricane.

- 1915 Galveston hurricane — The hurricane made landfall southwest of Galveston, Texas where atmospheric pressure was recorded at 27.76 inHg (940 mb) with wind speeds of 135 mph (217 km/h). Extreme high winds and heavy rain led to massive damage estimated at $921 million (2005 USD). However, the timely construction of the Galveston Seawall in the aftermath of the 1900 Galveston hurricane saved much of town, with only 11 people reported killed. The storm began to weaken after Galveston, turning northeast and passing Houston as a Category 1 hurricane before dropping to tropical storm status later that day.
- Battle of the Gulf of Riga — German battleships SMS Nassau and Posen dueled with Russian battleship Slava.
- Jewish American Leo Frank was abducted from his prison cell in Milledgeville, Georgia and lynched for the alleged murder of 13-year-old Mary Phagan in Atlanta. The lynch mob was organized by several prominent political figures in Georgia, including former state governor Joseph Mackey Brown and Eugene Herbert Clay, former mayor of Marietta, Georgia.
- Four German Navy airships attempted to bomb London, but two turned back with engine trouble, and a third mistakenly bombed open fields near Ashford and Faversham. The fourth airship, however, became the first to ever to reach London. But thinking they were over the central part of the city, the crew mistakenly bombed Leyton, hitting the railroad station and a number of houses, killing 10 people and injuring 48.
- The Qili-an and Miyanoshita stations opened in Taipei.

== August 18, 1915 (Wednesday) ==
- The Imperial Russian Army split the Northwestern Front army group into the Northern Front and Western Front following the Great Retreat that started in July.
- British submarine HMS E13 ran aground on Saltholm, Denmark. She was subsequently attacked by German torpedo boat SMS G 132 and another German torpedo boat, killing half of the 30-man crew. The survivors were rescued by Royal Danish Navy torpedo boats. The submarine was later refloated but was declared beyond repair, and subsequently scrapped in 1922.
- The VI Cavalry Corps of the Imperial German Army was established.
- Braves Field officially opened in Boston as home ballpark for the professional baseball team Boston Braves, with 46,000 in attendance to see the Braves defeat the St. Louis Cardinals 3–1. It would host the World Series that same year. The ballpark was purchased by Boston University in 1953 and much of the original stadium was demolished in 1955. However, most of the field and some portions of the original stadium survive as part of Nickerson Field.
- The Antelope Hill Highway Bridge was completed, spanning the Gila River in Tacna, Arizona. Flood waters damaged the bridge in 1916 and in 1929 when it permanently closed.
- Born:
  - Max Lanier, American baseball player, pitcher for the St. Louis Cardinals, New York Giants and St. Louis Browns, World Series champion in 1942 and 1944; as Hubert Max Lanier, in Denton, North Carolina, United States (d. 2007)
  - Pearly Brown, American blues musician, first African American musician to perform at the Grand Ole Opry; in Abbeville, Georgia, United States (d. 1986)
  - Agapito Mayor, Cuban baseball player, pitcher for the Almendares baseball club, 1949 Caribbean Series champion; in Sagua La Grande, Cuba (d. 2005)
- Died: Pierre Guillemin, 29, French rugby player, forward for the France national rugby union team from 1908 to 1911 and the Racing Club de France from 1906 to 1912; killed in action near Belleville-sur-Meuse (b. 1887)

== August 19, 1915 (Thursday) ==
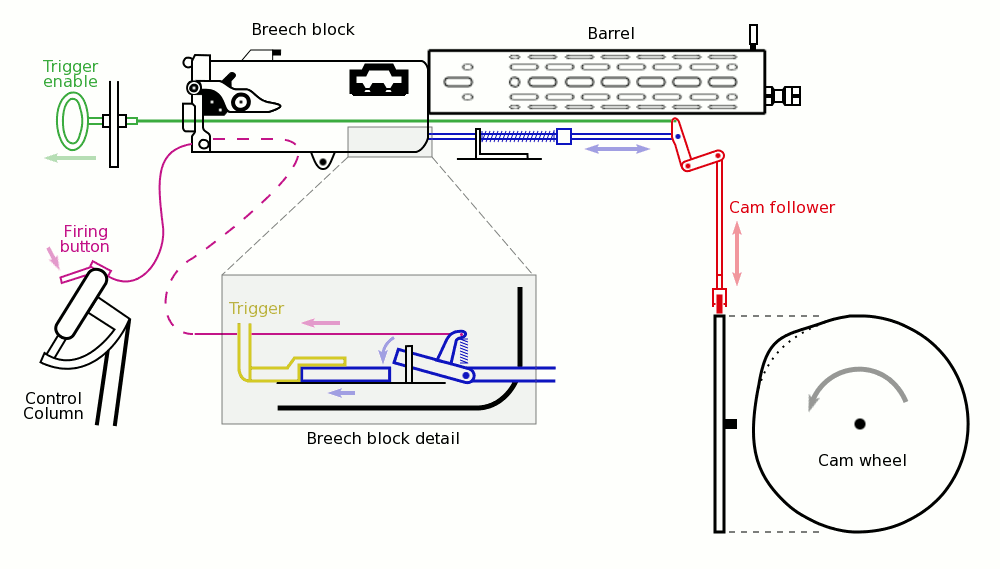
Diagram of Stangensteuerung synchronization mechanism used to allow a machine gun to fire between the whirling propellers of a German Fokker fighter plane during World War I.

- Battle of Chunuk Bair — Sporadic fighting wound down the battle as British and ANZAC forces gave up ground to the Ottomans in Gallipoli. British and ANZAC casualties were estimated between 12,000 and 13,000 casualties while Ottoman forces lost 9,200.
- Battle of the Gulf of Riga — The German High Seas Fleet was able to clear the Russian minefields and enter the gulf, but withdrew after German cruiser SMS Moltke was hit by a torpedo fired by British submarine HMS E1.
- British ocean liner Arabic was torpedoed and sunk in the Atlantic Ocean off the Old Head of Kinsale, County Donegal, Ireland by German submarine SM U-24 with the loss of 47 lives.
- Baralong incidents — German submarine SM U-27 was shelled and sunk in the Western Approaches by Royal Navy ship HMS Baralong with the loss of all 37 crew.
- German fighter pilot Oswald Boelcke shot down his first aircraft using the same Fokker airplane model equipped with a machine gun fitted with synchronization gear as fellow airman Kurt Wintgens.
- The Presbyterian Church in Western Australia held a ministers and church elders meetings to establish a Presbyterian college for girls to complement the existing Scotch College for boys in Perth. This led to the establishment of the Presbyterian Ladies' College the following year.
- Born:
  - John Dundas, British air force officer, member of the No. 609 Squadron during World War II, recipient of the Distinguished Flying Cross, brother to Hugh Dundas; in West Yorkshire, England (killed in action, 1940)
  - Ring Lardner Jr., American screenwriter, recipient of the Academy Award for Best Original Screenplay for Woman of the Year and M*A*S*H; as Ringgold Lardner Jr., in Chicago, United States (d. 2000)

== August 20, 1915 (Friday) ==
- 1915 Galveston hurricane — The hurricane was now a storm that passed over Missouri and the Ohio Valley before finally becoming an extratropical cyclone three days later. In all, the hurricane's destructive path left an estimated 275–400 people dead and $50 million (1915 USD, $921 million 2005 USD) in damages in Texas, Louisiana, and other U.S. Gulf states as well as Cuba and the Caribbean.
- Gallipoli campaign — The Dardanelles Committee met and determined that all British forces in France were to support a new French offensive, leaving only 25,000 reinforcement soldiers to support Gallipoli forces. It was concluded there would be not enough men and resources to take the peninsula from the Ottoman Empire.
- German forces captured the Russian fortress of Novogeorgievsk, Russian Empire with a loss of 90,000 casualties, 1,600 cannon and over a million artillery shells.
- The newly formed Australian 2nd Division landed at ANZAC Cove in Gallipoli.
- The first sustained aerial bombing offensive was made by Italy against Austria-Hungary.
- The British 1st Guards Brigade of the British Army Guards Brigade was established in France.
- A British engineer was recruited to develop the largest munitions factory in Great Britain to end the shortage of artillery shells needed for the war effort. He selected a site near Chilwell, England where the National Shell Filling Factory was built. Between 1915 until 1918, the factory produced some 19 million artillery shells. An accidental explosion on July 1, 1918, destroyed the factory and killed 134 people.
- German manufacturer ZF Friedrichshafen was established in Friedrichshafen, Germany to produce engine parts for airships but moved into its present role as a car parts manufacturer in 1919.
- Born:
  - George Roussos, American comic book artist, best known for being the primary inker for Jack Kirby, including the first issues of Fantastic Four; in Washington, D.C., United States (d. 2000)
  - Walter Orr Roberts, American atmospheric physicist and astronomer, founder of the High Altitude Observatory in Boulder, Colorado; in West Bridgewater, Massachusetts, United States (d. 1990)
  - Mool Chand Jain, Indian politician, member of the Indian independence movement and cabinet minister for the Jawaharlal Nehru administration; in Gohana, British India (present-day India) (d. 1997)
- Died:
  - Carlos Finlay, 81, Cuban pathologist, lead researcher into yellow fever, discovered it was transmitted through mosquitoes; died from a stroke (b. 1833)
  - Paul Ehrlich, 61, German scientist, recipient of the Nobel Prize in Physiology or Medicine for his pioneering techniques in identifying bacteria and chemotherapy; died after a heart attack (b. 1854)
  - Yitzchak Yaacov Reines, 75, Lithuanian Orthodox Jewish rabbi, founder of the Mizrachi, one of the earliest movements of Religious Zionism (b. 1839)

== August 21, 1915 (Saturday) ==
- Battle of Sari Bair — The Ottoman Empire regained control of the Sari Bair ridge from British and ANZAC forces on Gallipoli.
- Nicholas II of Russia removed Grand Duke Nicholas Nikolayevich as Commander-in-Chief of the Russian Army and personally took over the position.
- Battle of Hill 60 — An ANZAC force of 4,000 men launched the final major offensive of the Gallipoli Campaign in order secure key defensive positions for the Suvla landing.
- Battle of Scimitar Hill — The British launched the last major offensive against the Ottoman Empire in Gallipoli with a force of 14,300 men from the British 11th and 29th Divisions. The men were to take a curved summit near Suvla Bay that was originally planned to be assaulted on August 7. During the charge to take the hill, Irish soldier Gerald Robert O'Sullivan, who received the Victoria Cross for gallant action in July, and Irish officer and Second Boer War veteran Lord Longford were both killed by enemy fire (their bodies were never recovered). British forces withdrew under heavy fire with 5,300 casualties.
- The Keihin Railway extended the Keikyū Main Line in the Kanagawa Prefecture, Japan, with station Shinmachi serving the line.
- Tennis player Gordon Lowe defeated Horace Rice 4–6, 6–1, 6–1, 6–4 in the Men's Singles final to win the Australasian Championships title.
- Born: Ismat Chughtai, Indian writer, member of the Progressive Writers' Movement in India, recipient of the Padma Shri; in Badayun, British India (present-day India) (d. 1991)
- Died: Arthur James Dingle, 23, English rugby player, centre and wing for the England national rugby union team from 1912 to 1913, and the Hartlepool Rovers and Oxford University from 1911 to 1915; killed in action at the Battle of Scimitar Hill (b. 1891)

== August 22, 1915 (Sunday) ==
- Battle of Hill 60 — Reinforcements from the Australian 2nd Division launched a dawn attack on Ottoman strategic defense hold, but suffered 383 casualties out of 750 men.
- Born: Edward Szczepanik, Polish state leader, 44th Prime Minister of Poland; in Suwałki, Russian Empire (present-day Poland) (d. 1990)
- Died: William Middleton Wallace, 22, Scottish rugby player, fullback for the Cambridge University and the Scotland national rugby union team from 1912 to 1914; killed in action in northern France (b. 1892)

== August 23, 1915 (Monday) ==
- The Vernon Parish School Board in Leesville, Louisiana approved Pitkin School as a high school.

== August 24, 1915 (Tuesday) ==
- The town of Holbrook, New South Wales was renamed from Germanton due to Australia being at war with Germany.
- The borough Kulpmont, Pennsylvania was incorporated.
- Born:
  - Wynonie Harris, American blues singer, known for blues hits that later influenced rock music including "Good Rocking Tonight" and "All She Wants to Do Is Rock"; in Omaha, Nebraska, United States (d. 1969)
  - Alice Bradley Sheldon, American writer, better known by her pseudonym James Tiptree Jr., best known for her story collections Ten Thousand Light-Years from Home and Crown of Stars; in Chicago, United States (d. 1987)

== August 25, 1915 (Wednesday) ==
- Great Retreat — The Germans captured Brest-Litovsk in the Russian Empire (now Brest, Belarus).
- The international Ezras Torah Fund was established during a meeting the Agudath Harabonim in New York City, initially as relief fund for Orthodox Jews in Europe during World War I.
- German composer Max Reger completed his last major compositions, Requiem, in Jena, Germany. Based on a poem of the same name by Christian Friedrich Hebbel, it would premier the year after his death, his colleague Philipp Wolfrum conducting.
- Born: Georg von Boeselager, German army officer, member of the 20 July plot to assassinate Adolf Hitler, recipient of the Knight's Cross of the Iron Cross; in Kassel, German Empire (present-day Germany) (killed in action, 1944)

== August 26, 1915 (Thursday) ==
- Ross Sea party — The chief engineer for the British polar ship Aurora, adrift in the Ross Sea ice, created a makeshift rudder that could be used to help maneuver the ship once it was free of the ice. The original rudder was damaged by crushing ice in July.
- The 2nd Guards Brigade of the British Army Guards Brigade was established in France.
- German composer Siegfried Wagner, son of Richard Wagner, completed his opera An allem ist Hütchen schuld!. It would premier at the Stuttgart State Theatre in 1917.
- Born: Hal B. Jennings, American surgeon, 32nd Surgeon General of the United States Army; in Seneca Township, Michigan, United States (d. 2008)

== August 27, 1915 (Friday) ==
- Battle of Hill 60 — Further reinforcements from the Australian 2nd Division, including the 9th Light Horse Regiment of the Australian 3rd Light Horse Brigade arrived to take the summit from Ottomans. The assault proved a failure, with one wave of 75 men led by the new commander, Lieutenant Colonel Carew Reynell, being destroyed when it was caught in the open by Ottoman machine guns.
- Germany resumed submarine warfare against British commercial ships after weeks of postponement. German Chancellor Theobald von Bethmann Hollweg initially persuaded Kaiser Wilhelm to forbid action against ships flying neutral flags but it was realized that British ships could easily fly neutral flags.
- Born:
  - Norman Foster Ramsey Jr., American physicist, recipient of the Nobel Prize in Physics for the developing the separated oscillatory field method, now used in constructing atomic clocks; in Washington, D.C., United States (d. 2011)
  - Walter Heller, American economist, fifth Chair of the Council of Economic Advisers; in Buffalo, New York, United States (d. 1987)
  - Emil Verban, American baseball player, second baseman for the St. Louis Cardinals, Philadelphia Phillies, Chicago Cubs, and Boston Braves from 1944 to 1950, 1944 World Series champion; in Lincoln, Illinois, United States (d. 1989)

== August 28, 1915 (Saturday) ==
- Battle of Hill 60 — Bolstered by reinforcements for the Australian 10th Light Horse Regiment, ANZAC forces captured part of the summit but the Ottomans clung to the vital northern face which overlooked Suvla Bay.
- The first train operated over the re-gauged Ravenglass and Eskdale Railway using 15 in (381 mm) gauge equipment.
- The first print edition of the weekly community newspaper Gnowangerup Star and Tambellup Ongerup Gazette (later shortened to Gnowangerup Star in 1942) was distributed in Gnowangerup, Western Australia.
- Born: Patrick Hennessy, Irish painter, best known reviving the realist style in works such as Portrait of Elizabeth Bowen at Bowen's Court, in Cork, Ireland (d. 1980)
- Died: John Davis Long, 76, American politician, 32nd Governor of Massachusetts (b. 1838)

== August 29, 1915 (Sunday) ==
- Battle of Hill 60 — Further assaults failed to dislodge the Ottomans from the northern face of the hill, with ANZAC forces suffering 1,100 casualties.
- British submarine HMS C29 struck a mine and sank in the estuary off Humber, England with the loss of all 16 crew.
- Born: Ingrid Bergman, Swedish actress, best known for her lead roles in Intermezzo, Casablanca and Notorious, two-time recipient of the Academy Award for Best Actress for Gaslight and Anastasia, and Academy Award for Best Supporting Actress for Murder on the Orient Express; in Stockholm, Sweden (d. 1982)
- Died: Julius von Payer, 73, Austrian explorer, led the Austro-Hungarian North Pole expedition (b. 1841)

== August 30, 1915 (Monday) ==
- Mexican revolutionary leader Pascual Orozco, who plotted in the overthrow of Mexican presidents Porfirio Díaz and Francisco I. Madero in previous years, was killed along with four others in a gun battle against Texas Rangers and soldiers with the 13th Cavalry Regiment near the U.S-Mexican border. Orozco had been on the run from American authorities for two months after escaping house arrest in Newman, Texas.
- The Coffs Harbour railway station opened to serve the North Coast Line in Coffs Harbour, Australia.
- Born: Princess Lilian, Duchess of Halland, Welsh-Swedish model and noble, married to Prince Bertil, Duke of Halland of Sweden; as Lillian May Davies, in Swansea, Wales (d. 2013)
- Died: Antonio Flores Jijón, 81, 13th President of Ecuador (b. 1833)

== August 31, 1915 (Tuesday) ==
- The first French ace, Adolphe Pégoud, was killed in combat. He had scored six victories.
- Jimmy Lavender of the Chicago Cubs pitched a no-hitter against the New York Giants.
- The Aceh Museum is established in Banda Aceh, Indonesia.
- The Central Technical School was established in Toronto to offer high school students courses in visual arts and technical studies.
- Born:
  - Rose Gacioch, American baseball player, right fielder and pitcher for the All-American Girls Professional Baseball League from 1944 to 1954; in Wheeling, West Virginia, United States (d. 2004)
  - Gretl Braun, German matriarch, sister to Eva Braun; as Margarete Berta Braun, in Munich, German Empire (present-day Germany) (d. 1987)
  - Atma Jayaram, Indian intelligence officer, director of the Intelligence Bureau from 1971 to 1975 during the Indira Gandhi administration; in Colombo, British Ceylon (present-day Sri Lanka) (d. 1990)
  - Pete Newell, Canadian-American college basketball coach, head of the various college basketball clubs including the California Golden Bears men's basketball team from 1946 to 1960, and the 1960 United States men's Olympic basketball team, 1959 NCAA men's basketball championship team and gold medalist at the 1960 Summer Olympics; as Peter Newell, in Vancouver, Canada (d. 2008)
  - Ramon A. Alcaraz, Filipino naval officer, commodore of the Philippine Navy in 1965, recipient of the Silver Star; in Quingua, Central Luzon, Philippine Islands (present-day Plaridel, Bulacan, Philippines) (d. 2009)
