= September 1915 =

Month of 1915

<<	September 1915					>>
Su	Mo	Tu	We	Th	Fr	Sa
			1	2	3	4
5	6	7	8	9	10	11
12	13	14	15	16	17	18
19	20	21	22	23	24	25
26	27	28	29	30

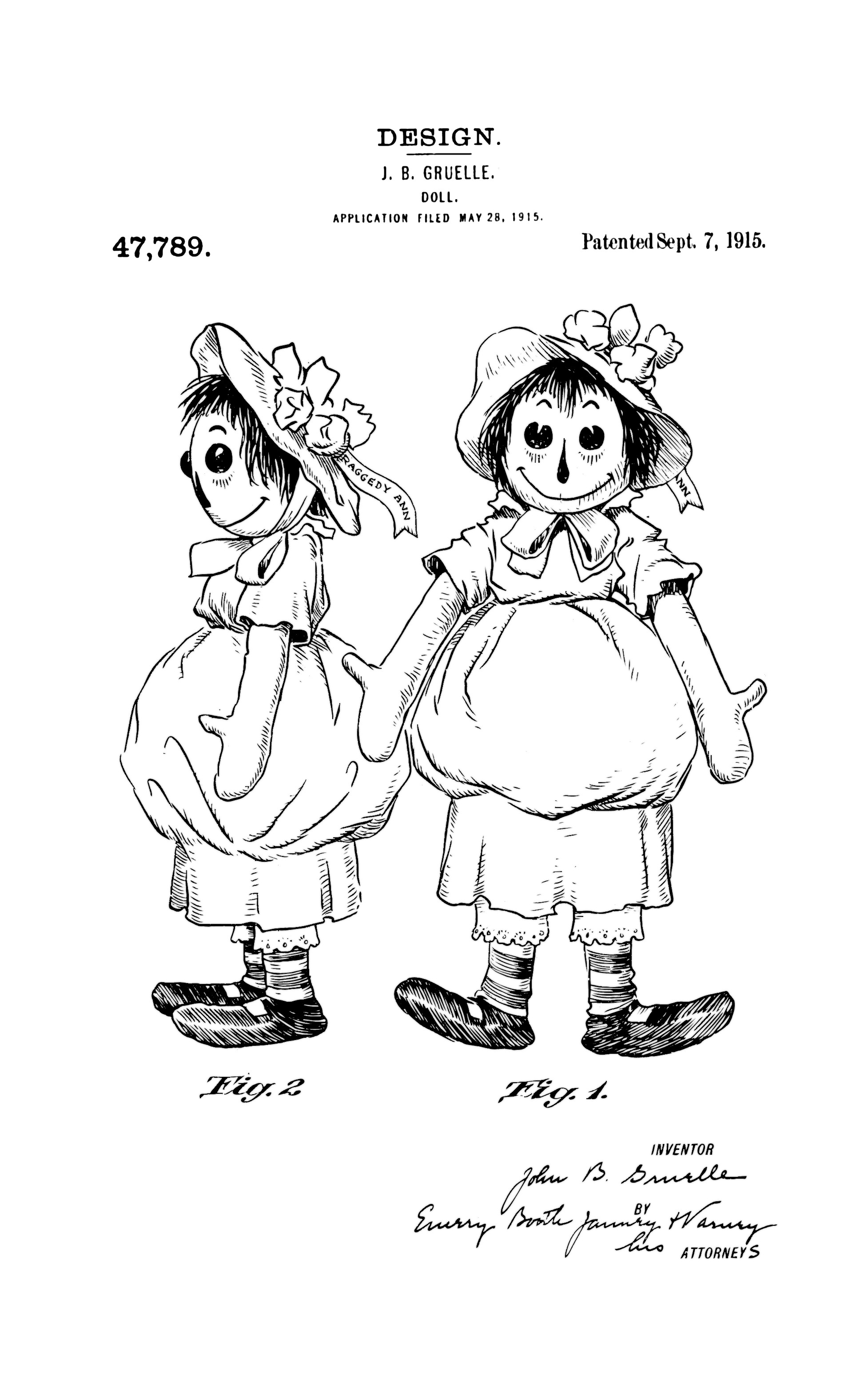
U.S. Patent design by Johnny Gruelle of the first Raggedy Ann doll.

The following events occurred in September 1915:

== September 1, 1915 (Wednesday) ==
- Siege of Mora – Allied forces brought in larger artillery pieces to bombard the German fort on Mora mountain in German Cameroon.
- The No. 19, No. 20, No. 22 and No. 23 Squadrons of the Royal Flying Corps were established.
- Ross Sea party – While marooned from the British polar ship Aurora after it drifted away from the Antarctic in the Southern Ocean, the main party regrouped and used stores from previous expeditions to replenish food, clothing and equipment for the next ten months. Expedition commander Aeneas Mackintosh decided the group would complete their original mission to set up supply depots on the Ross Ice Shelf for the Imperial Trans-Antarctic Expedition, one that would result in the longest sledging journey on record.
- Electronic manufacturer Yokogawa Electric was founded in Tokyo as a research institute specializing in metering before incorporating as a manufacturer in 1920.
- The Iwate Light Railway was extended in the Iwate Prefecture, Japan, with station Aozasa serving the line.
- Born: Ken Aston, English sports official, developed the penalty card system for association football; as Kenneth George Aston, in Colchester, England (d. 2001)
- Died: Inoue Kaoru, 79, Japanese state leader, cabinet minister for the Itō Hirobumi administration including the first Minister for Foreign Affairs (b. 1836)

== September 2, 1915 (Thursday) ==
- The British troopship SS Vaderland was hit by a torpedo launched by German submarine UB-14 in the Aegean Sea and beached on the island of Lemnos, with the entire crew surviving. The ship was repaired and returned to service in 1916.
- Siege of Mora – A French force of 42 men made a second attempt to capture a local village near the Mora German fort in German Cameroon that had been helping the defenders, but were again repulsed with seven dead.
- The Knockaloe rail line opened on the Isle of Man to serve the Knockaloe Internment Camp and its 23,000 prisoners of war and 3,000 guards.
- American actor John Barrymore's fifth film The Incorrigible Dukane was released through Famous Players, and remains the earliest surviving Barrymore film.
- Born: Meinhardt Raabe, American actor, last surviving cast member of the film The Wizard of Oz with dialogue, played the Munchkin coroner who certified that the Wicked Witch of the East was dead; in Watertown, Wisconsin, United States (d. 2010)

== September 3, 1915 (Friday) ==
- The Mexican rebel faction Seditionistas raided the village of Ojo de Agua, Texas, forcing the United States government to deploy cavalry and signalmen to protect the Mexican-U.S. border.
- British ocean liner RMS Hesperian, carrying 814 passengers and 300 crew, was torpedoed by German U-boat SM U-20 soon after leaving Liverpool. Aboard were wounded Canadian soldiers returning home. The ship was evacuated within an hour to rescue ships in the area but 32 people died when a lifeboat was upset while lowering.<
- Four Imperial German Navy airships attempted to bomb England, but the L40 airship was struck by lightning and crashed in flames in the North Sea near Neuwerk, Germany, with the loss of her entire 20-man crew.
- The P. G. Wodehouse novel Something Fresh is first published as a book in New York City by D. Appleton & Company.
- Born:
  - Memphis Slim, American blues musician, best known for blues hit "Every Day I Have the Blues;" as John Len Chatman, in Memphis, Tennessee, United States (d. 1988)
  - Eddie Stanky, American baseball player, second baseman for the Chicago Cubs, Brooklyn Dodgers, Boston Braves, New York Giants, and St. Louis Cardinals between 1943 and 1953; as Edward Raymond Stanky, in Philadelphia, United States (d. 1999)
- Died: Wilbur Dartnell, 30, Australian soldier, recipient of the Victoria Cross; killed in action in German East Africa during World War I (b. 1885)

== September 4, 1915 (Saturday) ==
- British submarine HMS E7 was scuttled after being caught in an anti-submarine net in the Dardanelles.
- Following heavy casualties sustained at the Battle of Scimitar Hill during the Gallipoli campaign, five depleted British mounted brigades were combined to form the 1st and 2nd Composite Mounted Brigades, which were active four months until dissolved on their return to Egypt.

== September 5, 1915 (Sunday) ==
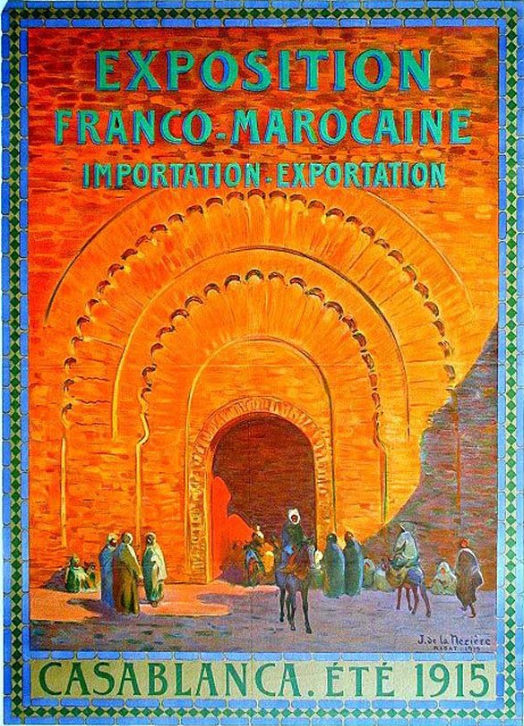
Original poster advertising the Casablanca Fair of 1915.

- The first Zimmerwald Conference was held in the Swiss city for over three days by anti-militarist socialist parties from countries that were originally neutral during World War I.
- The Casablanca Fair officially opened for a two-month affair in Casablanca, with exhibitions representing the six major regions of Morocco as well as engineering and government projects.
- The first baptism was recorded in the Flower Lane Church, established months earlier in Fuzhou, China by Methodist missionary John W. Gowdy.
- Born:
  - Raymond Telles, American politician, first Mexican American to serve as a U.S. ambassador and serve as mayor for a major American city, Mayor of El Paso from 1957 to 1961, ambassador to Costa Rica from 1961 to 1967; in El Paso, Texas, United States (d. 2013)
  - Paul Păun, Romanian-Israeli poet, member of the Proletkult movement in Eastern Europe; as Zaharia Herșcovici, in Bucharest, Kingdom of Romania (present-day Romania) (d. 1994)
- Died: David Bedell-Sivright, 34, Scottish rugby player, forward for the Scotland national rugby union team from 1900 to 1908 and the British and Irish Lions from 1903 to 1904; killed in action during the Gallipoli campaign (b. 1880)

== September 6, 1915 (Monday) ==
- Bulgaria signed alliance treaties with Germany and the Ottoman Empire.
- While under tow to Queenstown, Ireland, RMS Hesperian sinks, almost three days after she was torpedoed, about 37 miles (60 km) from the Irish coast.
- Born: Franz Josef Strauss, German politician, Minister President of Bavaria from 1978 to 1988; in Munich, Kingdom of Bavaria, German Empire (present-day Bavaria, Germany) (d. 1988)

== September 7, 1915 (Tuesday) ==
- Two Imperial German Army airships raided England. One of the airships bombed Millwall, Deptford, Greenwich, and Woolwich, but crash-landed in Germany short of her base after suffering engine failure on the way home. The other dropped most of her bomb load on greenhouses in Cheshunt before dropping her lone remaining incendiary bomb onto a shop on Fenchurch Street in London.
- Siege of Mora – British forces launched an attack on the German defensive positions around Mora in German Cameroon but were beaten back, with 15 African colonial soldiers and a British officer killed and five German troops wounded.
- The British Army established the 120th Brigade.
- American cartoonist Johnny Gruelle was given a patent for his Raggedy Ann doll.
- The community of Dikson was established in Krasnoyarsk Krai, Russia.
- Born: Jock Dodds, Scottish association football player, striker for the Scotland national football team during World War II and clubs including Sheffield from 1932 to 1950; as Ephraim Dodds, in Grangemouth, Scotland (d. 2007)

== September 8, 1915 (Wednesday) ==
- Four German Navy Zeppelins attempt to bomb England. Two suffered engine trouble, while another attacked a benzole plant at Skinningrove, Yorkshire. However, her bombs failed to penetrate the roof of the benzol house or of a neighboring TNT store, and there were no casualties. The fourth reached London, dropping of a 300-kg (661-lb) bomb, the largest yet dropped on Britain, on address No.61 Farringdon Road where it killed 22 people and inflicted the most damage by a single airship or airplane bombing raid throughout all of World War I. The No. 61 was rebuilt in 1917 and called The Zeppelin Building.
- Pro tennis player Bill Johnston defeated Maurice McLoughlin 1–6, 6–0, 7–5, 10–8 in the final to win the men's singles tennis title at the U.S. National Championships.
- Born:
  - Frank Cady, American actor, best known as shopkeeper Sam Drucker in the 1960s TV sitcoms Petticoat Junction, Green Acres, and The Beverly Hillbillies; in Susanville, California, United States (d. 2012)
  - Duffy Daugherty, American football coach, head of the Michigan State Spartans football team from 1954 to 1972, two-time NCAA champion; as Hugh Duffy Daugherty, in Emeigh, Pennsylvania, United States (d. 1987)
  - Frank Pullen, English businessman, owner of property developer Pullen Estates and the Pullen Shops chain in Great Britain; as Francis Henry Pullen, in London, England (d. 1992)
  - Nela Arias-Misson, Cuban artist, member of the abstract expressionism movement; as Manuela Paula Covadonga Josefa Arias García, in Havana, Cuba (d. 2015)
- Died: Jack Verge, 35, Australian rugby player, fullback for the Australia national rugby union team for 1904, and New South Wales Waratahs from 1902 to 1904; died of dysentery (b. 1880)

== September 9, 1915 (Thursday) ==
- At a meeting of the Fourth State Duma, the legislative assembly of the Russian Empire, elected members associated with the Progressive Bloc pushed for the resignations of all ministers if the Bloc's program of expanded democratic freedoms was not adopted. This led to calls for the Fourth Duma to be suspended.

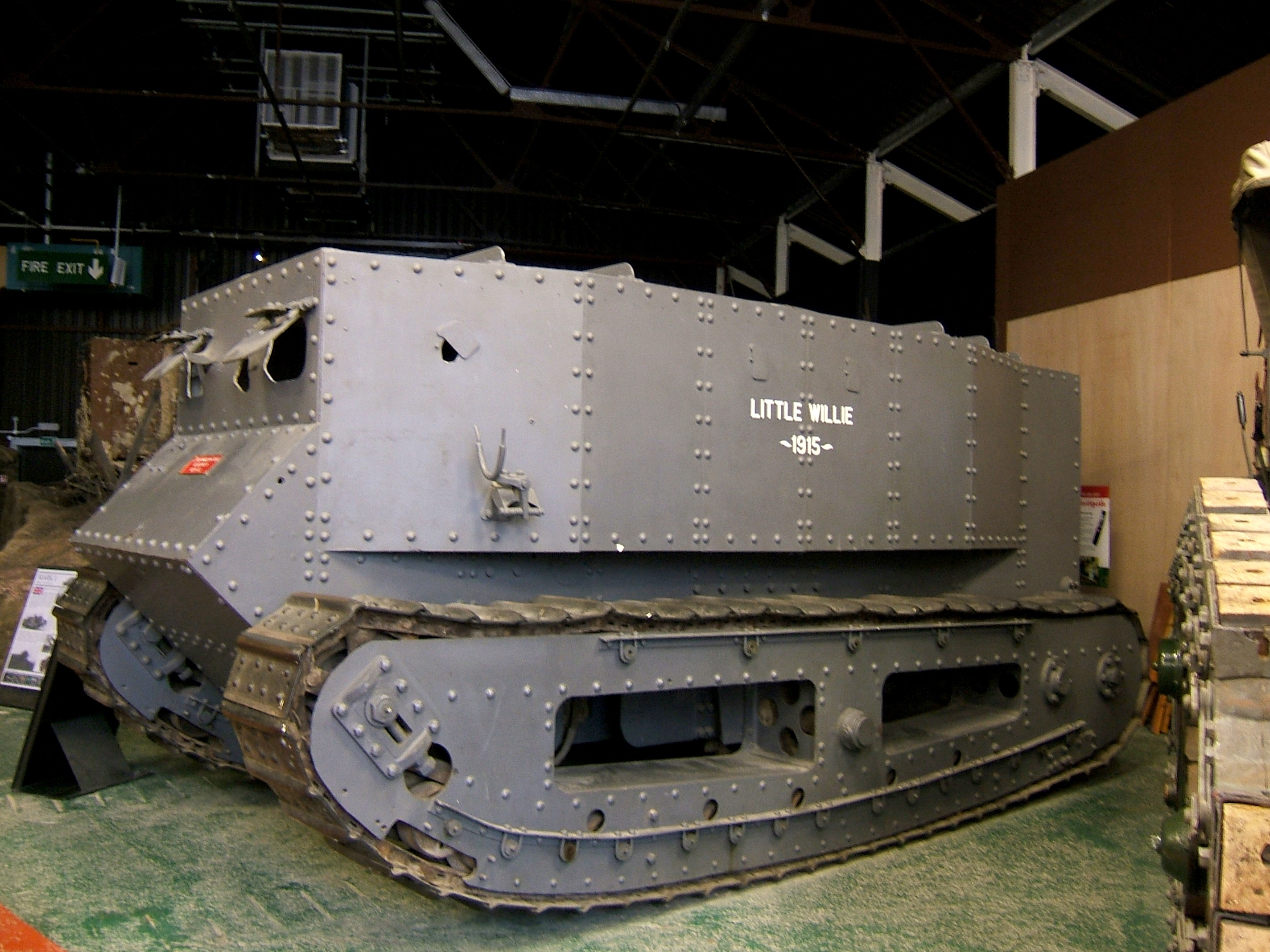
"Little Willie", the prototype for the first British military tank.

- William Foster & Co. of Lincoln, England, completed the first prototype military tank, nicknamed "Little Willie".
- An ammunition explosion aboard the U.S. Navy destroyer USS Decatur (DD-5) killed three sailors.
- American academic scholars Carter G. Woodson and Jesse E. Moorland established the Association for the Study of Negro Life and History in Chicago and incorporated it as an official organization in Washington, D.C., on October 2. It would be renamed Association for the Study of African American Life and History in 1973. The organization's official mission is "to promote, research, preserve, interpret, and disseminate information about Black life, history, and culture to the global community."
- Born:
  - Arthur Lithgow, American actor, member of the Little Theatre Movement, father to John Lithgow; in Puerto Plata, Dominican Republic (d. 2004)
  - Richard B. Sellars, American business executive, chairman and CEO of Johnson & Johnson from 1970 to 1976; in Worcester, Massachusetts, United States (d. 2010)
  - Gozo Shioda, Japanese martial artist, founder of the Yoshinkan style of aikido, in Shinjuku, Tokyo, Empire of Japan (present-day Japan) (d. 1994)
- Died: A. G. Spalding, 66, baseball player and sporting goods manufacturer, co-founder of Spalding and pitcher for the Chicago White Stockings; died of a stroke (b. 1850)

== September 10, 1915 (Friday) ==
- Great Britain sent out an appeal to all countries in the Dominion to mobilize military units specialized in tunnel warfare.
- The Anglo-French Financial Commission led by Lord Chief Justice Rufus Isaacs met with American financial leaders, including J. P. Morgan Jr., in New York City to discuss obtaining private wartime funding.
- The Hellenic Army in Greece established the 15th and 16th Infantry Divisions.
- The Ise Electric Railway opened the Nagoya Line in the Mie Prefecture, Japan, with stations Shiroko, Koyasu Kannon, Isoyama and Isshindencho serving the line.
- Born:
  - Edmond O'Brien, American actor, known for his roles in D.O.A., Seven Days in May, and The Wild Bunch, recipient of the Academy Award for Best Supporting Actor for The Barefoot Contessa; in New York City, United States (d. 1985)
  - Joachim Helbig, German air force officer, commander of Lehrgeschwader 1 for the Luftwaffe during World War II, recipient of the Knight's Cross of the Iron Cross; in Dahlen, Saxony, German Empire (present-day Germany) (d. 1985)
- Died:
  - Charles Boucher de Boucherville, 93, Canadian politician, third Premier of Quebec (b. 1822)
  - Joseph George Megler, 77, American politician, member and speaker of the Washington House of Representatives from 1889 to 1912 (b. 1838)
  - Bagha Jatin, 35, Indian revolutionary leader, member of the Indian independence movement and co-founder of the Jugantar revolutionary group; died from gunshot wounds (b. 1879)

== September 11, 1915 (Saturday) ==
- Bulgaria began to mobilize its forces for World War I, which included 469,169 men in 390 battalions, into the First, Second and Third Armies.
- The Joseon Industrial Exhibition opened in Gyeongseong, Korea (now Seoul) to mark the fifth anniversary of Japanese Korea.
- The Pennsylvania Railroad began electrified commuter rail service between Paoli and Philadelphia, using overhead AC trolley wires for power. This type of system was later used in long-distance passenger trains between New York City, Washington, D.C., and Harrisburg, Pennsylvania.
- A nitrate fire at Famous Players in New York destroyed several completed but unreleased silent films which were later remade. Films lost included Mary Pickford's Esmerelda and The Foundling and John Barrymore's The Red Widow.
- Born:
  - Raúl Alberto Lastiri, Argentine state leader, 39th President of Argentina; in Buenos Aires, Argentina (d. 1978)
  - Carl Fallberg, American animator, known for his film and TV work for Disney, Hanna-Barbera, and Warner Bros.; in Cleveland, Tennessee, United States (d. 1996)
- Died:
  - William Sprague, 84, American politician, 27th Governor of Rhode Island; died of complications from meningitis (b. 1830)
  - William Cornelius Van Horne, 72, Canadian rail executive, oversaw the major construction of the Canadian Pacific Railway, youngest superintendent of the Illinois Central Railroad (b. 1843)

== September 12, 1915 (Sunday) ==
- Belgium fighter pilot Jan Olieslagers forced down a German Aviatik while flying a Nieuport named le Demon ("The Demon"), becoming the first Belgian pilot to score an aerial victory.
- Fearing growing public backlash for bombing civilian targets in London, Chief of the German General Staff General Erich von Falkenhayn issued a statement that restricted German Army airships to bombing London's docks and harbor works.
- Sports club El Porvenir was formed in Lanús Partido, Greater Buenos Aires, Argentina as a wrestling club but added association football to the organization in 1918.
- The sports stadium Hammarby was opened in Stockholm as the home field for the recently formed Hammarby association football team.
- Born: Billy Daniels, American jazz singer, best known for the hit "That Ole Black Magic;" as William Boone Daniels, in Jacksonville, Florida, United States (d. 1988)
- Died:
  - Fritz Bartholomae, 28, German Olympic bronze medalist in rowing; killed in action in Latvia (b. 1886)
  - Lyman U. Humphrey, 71, American politician, 11th Governor of Kansas (b. 1844)

== September 13, 1915 (Monday) ==
- With the arrival of the 2nd Canadian Division in France (and supported by the 4th Canadian Infantry Brigade), a separate Canadian Corps was created. It expanded to include the 3rd Canadian Division in December.
- The Imperial German Army established the 85th Landwehr Division.
- Safford High School was established for senior students in Safford, Arizona.
- The crime drama Regeneration was released. Directed by Raoul Walsh and starring Rockliffe Fellowes and Anna Q. Nilsson, it was considered the first feature-length gangster film based on an actual person (screenwriter Carl Harbaugh and Walsh adapted the story from a memoir My Mamie Rose by Owen Kildare). The film was considered lost until a copy was discovered in the 1970s, and is now preserved at the Library of Congress.
- Born: Andrew Heiskell, American publisher, CEO of Time Inc. from 1960 to 1980; in Naples, Kingdom of Italy (present-day Italy) (d. 2003)
- Died: Andrew L. Harris, 79, American politician, 44th Governor of Ohio (b. 1835)

== September 14, 1915 (Tuesday) ==
- In compliance with orders from the German General Staff, Admiral Henning von Holtzendorff, Chief of the German Naval Staff, ordered German naval airships raiding London to restrict their bombing targets to the banks of the River Thames and as far as possible to avoid bombing the poorer, working-class northern quarter of the city.
- The funeral train for William Cornelius Van Horne departed from Windsor Station in Montreal at 11:00 AM bound for Joliet, Illinois; the train was pulled by CP 4-6-2 no. 2213.
- Born: John Dobson, American amateur astronomer, creator of the Dobsonian telescope; in Beijing, Republic of China (present-day China) (d. 2014)
- Died: Edward H. Ripley, 75, American army officer and businessman, served as Union officer during the American Civil War and served at Shenandoah Valley and Battle of Chaffin's Farm, one of the architects of the Raritan River Railroad in New Jersey (b. 1839)

== September 15, 1915 (Wednesday) ==
- British troopship Patagonia was torpedoed and sunk in the Black Sea 10.5 nautical miles (19.4 km) off Odessa by German submarine SM UB-7, with all crew surviving.
- German submarine SM U-6 was torpedoed and sunk in the North Sea off Stavanger, Rogaland, Norway by Royal Navy submarine HMS E16 with the loss of 24 of her 29 crew.
- British gunboat HMS Aphis was launched by Ailsa Shipbuilding Company in Troon, South Ayrshire, Scotland for service at Port Said in Egypt, but won most its battle honors during World War II.
- The United States Court of Appeals for the Fourth Circuit ruled that persons from the Middle East were racially white and have the right to become naturalized U.S. citizens.
- The Chinese magazine New Youth (also known as La Juenesse) published its first issue in Shanghai. Founded by Chen Duxiu, a leader of the anti-imperial Xinhai Revolution, the magazine would play an important role advocating Western-style democracy pertaining to the New Culture Movement in China during the 1910s and 1920s. Duxiu advertised the new magazine his established political publication The Tiger but later merged the editorials in October.
- The Dutch daily newspaper Het Belgisch Dagblad was published in The Hague as an organ of the Flemish Patriotic League.
- The Belgium monarchy created the Queen Elisabeth Medal to recognize exceptional services to Belgium in the relief of the suffering of its citizens during World War I.
- Born:
  - Fawn M. Brodie, American academic and writer, author of Joseph Smith biography No Man Knows My History; as Fawn McKay, in Ogden, Utah, United States (d. 1981)
  - Karam Singh, Indian soldier, recipient of the Param Vir Chakra, the first Sikh to be awarded the military honor; in Barnala, British India (present-day India) (d. 1993)

== September 16, 1915 (Thursday) ==
- The United States Senate ratified the Haitian–American Convention which allowed United States to provide security and handle finances in Haiti for the next 10 years.
- The Fourth State Duma in the Russian Empire was suspended and would not meet again until February 1916.
- A general election was held in the Canadian province of Prince Edward Island with the incumbent Progressive Conservative Party of Prince Edward Island and Premier John Alexander Mathieson re-elected with 17 seats in the Legislative Assembly, although they lost a number of seats to the Prince Edward Island Liberal Party who gained 13.
- The first British Women's Institute meeting was held in Llanfairpwllgwyngyll, Wales.
- The Anchorage Woman's Club was established in Anchorage, Alaska.
- The first edition of the UK release of the P. G. Wodehouse novel Something Fresh was published in London by Methuen & Company.

== September 17, 1915 (Friday) ==
- The German 1st Army was dissolved but would reform the following summer for the Battle of the Somme.
- French Air Force squadron Escadrille 67 was established.
- The New Zealand Tunnelling Company of the New Zealand Army was established, the first tunnel warfare unit in the Dominion created to serve in World War I.
- Born: M. F. Husain, Indian artist, founding member of The Progressive Artists Group of Bombay; as Maqbool Fida Husain, in Pandharpur, British India (present-day India) (d. 2011)
- Died:
  - Konstantin Makovsky, 76, Russian painter, member of the Peredvizhniki group; died in a tram accident (b. 1839)
  - Orme, 26, British racehorse, first two-time winner of the Eclipse Stakes (b. 1889)

== September 18, 1915 (Saturday) ==
- The Imperial German Army created the army command Army Detachment D for the Eastern Front.
- The Carlton Football Club won the 19th Australian Football League Premiership, beating Collingwood Football Club 11.12 (78) to 6.9 (45) at the Melbourne Cricket Ground in the Victoria Football League Grand Final.
- The short story "Extricating Young Gussie" by P. G. Wodehouse was published in The Saturday Evening Post. The story introduced two of the author's two most popular characters, the ingenious valet Jeeves and his master Bertie Wooster.
- Died: Susan La Flesche Picotte, 50, American physician, first Native American woman to earn a medical degree; died of bone cancer (b. 1865)

== September 19, 1915 (Sunday) ==
- Great Retreat – The Germans occupied Vilna (now Vilnius, the capital of Lithuania), ending the Gorlice–Tarnów Offensive that had started in May.
- Greek passenger ship Athinai was carrying 508 people when it caught fire, killing one person and sinking in the Atlantic Ocean. The survivors were rescued by British ships Roumanian Prince and Tuscania.
- The Austro-Hungarian Army created the army group Böhm-Ermolli to serve on the Eastern Front.
- Comedian W. C. Fields made his film debut in the slapstick comedy Pool Sharks followed up by His Lordship's Dilemma, both filmed in New York City.
- Born:
  - Dorothy Bridges, American actress and poet, wife to Lloyd Bridges, mother to Beau Bridges and Jeff Bridges; as Dorothy Simpson, in Worcester, Massachusetts, United States (d. 2009)
  - Blanche Thebom, American opera singer, best known for her collaboration with the Metropolitan Opera; in Monessen, Pennsylvania, United States (d. 2010)
  - Germán Valdés, Mexican comedian, promoted Spanglish as "Tin-Tan"; in Mexico City, Mexico (d. 1973)

== September 20, 1915 (Monday) ==
- Gallipoli campaign – The Royal Newfoundland Regiment landed at Suvla Bay to provide needed support for Allied forces in Gallipoli.
- St. Joseph Junior College opened in St. Joseph, Missouri as the eighth junior college in the United States. The college became Western Missouri Junior College in 1965, and a state college by 1973. In 2005, the institution was officially established as the Missouri Western State University.
- The Cecil Plains railway line opened between Oakey and Evanslea, Queensland.
- Rail stations Hessay, Newby Wiske, and Smardale were closed in England as part of wartime measures.
- The futsal club Atlântico was established in Erechim, Brazil.
- The association football club Del Plata was formed in Buenos Aires, named after the marketplace where many of the founders worked at. The club was prominent in the Argentine Primera División during the 1920s but dissolved in 1947. The club was revived in the mid-1960s but closed for good by the 1990s.
- Born: Nguyễn Văn Hinh, Vietnamese army officer, chief of staff of the Vietnamese National Army, first Vietnamese officer to be promoted to commanding officer in the French Armed Forces; in Mỹ Tho, French Indochina (present-day Vietnam) (d. 2004)

== September 21, 1915 (Tuesday) ==
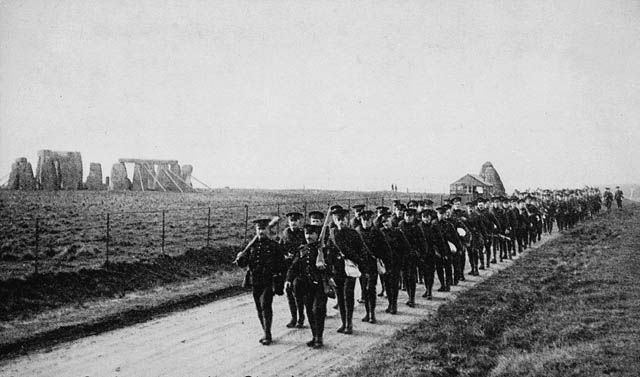
The Canadian 10th Battalion marches past Stonehenge as it is being restored.

- British land owner and businessman Cecil Chubb acquired Stonehenge at auction for £6600. He would donate the ancient site and land back to public in 1918.
- The No. 24 Squadron of the Royal Flying Corps was established at Hounslow Heath Aerodrome in London.
- The Texas Military College was established in Terrell, Texas, providing schooling for junior, senior and junior college students until its closing in 1949. Its building and land was sold to Southwestern Christian College in 1950.
- The New York City Subway added stations to the BMT Fourth Avenue Line in Brooklyn including 45th Street and 53rd Street.
- Born: Roy D. Chapin Jr., American business executive, chairman and CEO of the American Motors Corporation from 1967 to 1977; in Grosse Pointe, Michigan, United States (d. 2001)
- Died: Austin Flint II, 79, American physician, known for his research into the function of the liver, son of Austin Flint I (b. 1836)

== September 22, 1915 (Wednesday) ==
- Ross Sea party – British polar ship Aurora, drifting in the ice of the Southern Ocean, caught sight of the Balleny Islands which allowed first officer Joseph Stenhouse to estimate the vessel had traveled over 700 nautical miles (1,300 km) from Cape Evans where most of the expedition was marooned.
- The Bishop England High School opened in Charleston, South Carolina, enrolling 67 students from grades 7 to 11. The school was named after the first Bishop of Charleston, John England.
- Born: Arthur Lowe, English actor, best known for the role of Captain Mainwaring in the British television comedy Dad's Army; in Hayfield, England (d. 1982)

== September 23, 1915 (Thursday) ==
- An earthquake with a magnitude of 6.2 occurred outside of Asmara, Eritrea but damage to property was minor.
- British cargo ship Chancellor was shelled and sunk in the Atlantic Ocean 86 nautical miles (159 km) southeast of the Fastnet Rock by German submarine SM U-41, but the entire crew survived.
- The German 11th Army, dissolved only two weeks earlier, was reformed to participate in the Serbian campaign.
- The Collegiate School was established in Richmond, Virginia.
- Louisville Collegiate School was established in Louisville, Kentucky as a preparatory school for women entering college, and remained a girls-only school until 1972.
- Actor Douglas Fairbanks made his leading film debut in the comedy Western film innocently titled The Lamb, directed by Christy Cabanne. Based on the popular 1913 Broadway play The New Henrietta, the drawing room antics of the stage were expanded to include Western genre elements that showcased Fairbanks' physical prowess.
- Born:
  - Clifford Shull, American physicist, recipient of the Nobel Prize in Physics for the development of the neutron scattering technique; in Pittsburgh, United States (d. 2001)
  - John C. Sheehan, American chemist, developed the process of synthesizing penicillin; in Battle Creek, Michigan, United States (d. 1992)
  - Zdenko Blažeković, Croatian fascist leader, member of the Ustashe regime of Yugoslavia during World War II; in Bihać, Austria-Hungary (present-day Bosnia and Herzegovina) (executed, 1947)
  - Hans Larive, Dutch naval officer, escapee from the German POW camp Oflag IV-C at Colditz Castle, recipient of the Military Order of William, Order of Orange-Nassau, Bronze Cross, and Distinguished Service Cross; as Etienne Henri Larive, in Singapore (d. 1984)

== September 24, 1915 (Friday) ==
- Baralong incidents – German submarine SM U-41 was shelled and sunk in the Western Approaches by Royal Navy ship HMS Wyandra with the loss of 35 of her 37 crew.
- Born: Shaukat Hayat Khan, Indian-Pakistani military officer and politician, member of the Pakistan Movement and co-founder of the Muslim League; in Amritsar, Punjab, British India (present-day India) (d. 1998)

== September 25, 1915 (Saturday) ==
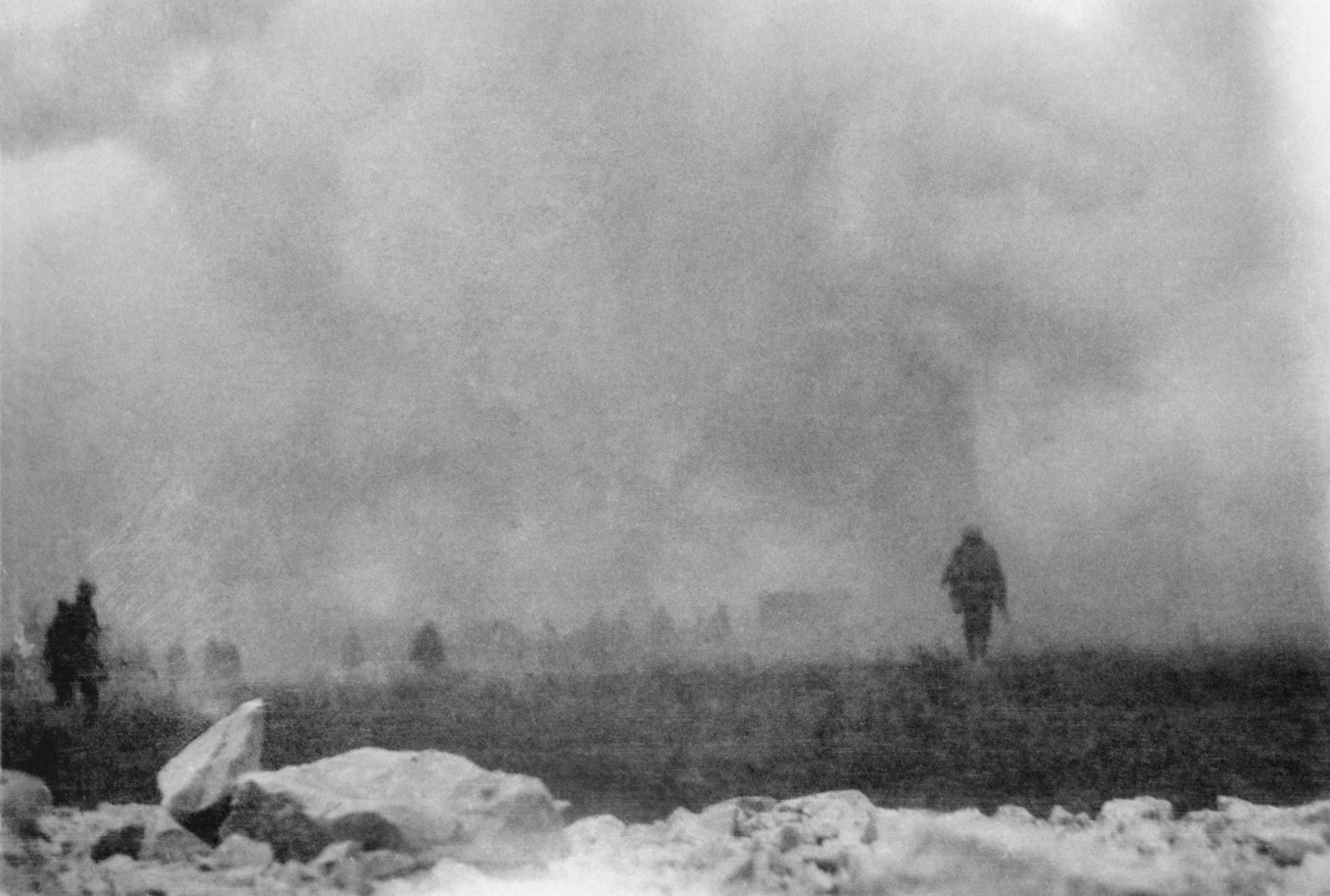
British infantry advancing through gas at Loos, 25 September 1915.

- Third Battle of Artois – The French Tenth Army launched an attack on the German line on the Western Front to complement British attacks at Loos and Champagne, France.
- Battle of Loos – British forces took the French town of Loos-en-Gohelle but with substantial casualties and were unable to press their advantage. It was the first time the British used poison gas in World War I and also their first large-scale use of the new Kitchener's Army units. At least three Victoria Crosses were awarded posthumously for bravery in the field, with the recipients being Anketell Moutray Read, Arthur Forbes Gordon Kilby, and George Peachment.
- Actions of the Hohenzollern Redoubt – British forces assaulted the Hohenzollern Redoubt, a defensive strong point for the German Sixth Army on the Western Front.
- Second Battle of Champagne – The French Second and Fourth Armies attacked the German line near Champagne, France, breaking it in four places and capturing 14,000 soldiers and several guns despite heavy casualties.
- Gallipoli campaign – Field Marshal Herbert Kitchener demanded two British divisions and one French for service in Salonika, Greece, marking the beginning of the end of the campaign on the Turkish peninsula.
- The No. 25 Squadron of the Royal Flying Corps was established at RAF Montrose in Scotland.
- The New York Subway opened the IND Fulton Street Line along with stations 80th Street, 88th Street, Rockaway Boulevard, 104th Street, 111th Street, and Lefferts Boulevard.
- The Queensland War Council was established in Queensland, Australia to assist Australian World War I veterans and their families.
- The Sturt Football Club won their first South Australian National Football League premiership, beating Port Adelaide 6.10 (46) to 4.10 (34) in the SAFL Grand Final.
- The Subiaco Football Club defeated Perth 3.3 (21) to 2.7 (19) to win their third West Australian Football League premiership.
- The sports club Forward was established in Oslo for hockey, and became one of the founding members of GET-ligaen, the premier Norwegian hockey league.
- Born:
  - Devi Lal, Indian politician, 6th Deputy Prime Minister of India; as Devi Dayal, in Teja Khera, British India (present-day India) (d. 2001)
  - Ernesto Lazzatti, Argentine association football player, midfielder for the Argentina national football team from 1936 to 1937, and the Boca Juniors and Danubio from 1934 to 1948; in Bahía Blanca, Argentina (d. 1988)
- Died:
  - Ernest Deane, 28, Irish rugby player and army medical officer, member of the Ireland national rugby union team in 1909, recipient of the Military Cross; killed in action at the Battle of Loos (b. 1887)
  - Johnny Poe, 41, American football player, quarterback for the Princeton Tigers football team 1891 to 1892, and its assistant coach from 1897 to 1909, cousin to Edgar Allan Poe; killed in action at the Battle of Loos (b. 1874)

== September 26, 1915 (Sunday) ==
- Third Battle of Artois – The French captured the village of Souchez, France, but failed to make headway south-east of Neuville-Saint-Vaast.
- Battle of Loos – German forces were able to reinforce their defenses before the British launched a second attack, inflicting 8,000 casualties on 10,000 British soldiers in a four-hour time period.
- Second Battle of Champagne – The French advanced and closed a 7.5-mile (12.1 km) gap, capturing another 2,000 German soldiers.
- The opera Mona Lisa, composed by Max von Schillings, premiered at the Stuttgart Opera House in Germany. It is a fictitious story of the subject behind the painting by Leonardo da Vinci, which had been stolen and returned to Paris two years earlier.
- Died:
  - Keir Hardie, 59, Scottish politician, Leader of the Labour Party from 1906 to 1908; died after a series of strokes (b. 1856)
  - Tsuruko Haraguchi, 29, Japanese psychologist, first Japanese woman to receive a Doctor of Philosophy; died of tuberculosis (b. 1886)
  - Ed Cushman, 63, American baseball player, pitcher for the Major League Baseball from 1883 to 1890 for teams including the Philadelphia Athletics (b. 1852)

== September 27, 1915 (Monday) ==
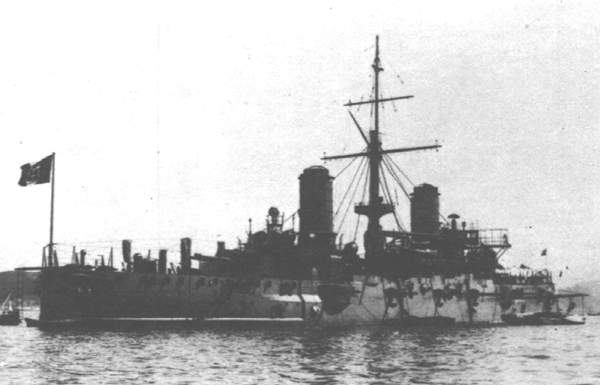
Italian battleship Benedetto Brin.

- Italian battleship Benedetto Brin was sunk at Brindisi, Apulia, Italy due to sabotage by Austro-Hungarian forces with the loss of 387 of her 841 crew.
- The British Royal Family lost one of their own during World War I when Fergus Bowes-Lyon, older brother of Elizabeth Bowes-Lyon, later Queen Elizabeth The Queen Mother. was killed during fighting on the Hohenzollern Redoubt. The same day, author Rudyard Kipling's only son John was killed during the Battle of Loos, just weeks after his 18th birthday.
- British ship HMS Caribbean foundered in the Atlantic Ocean 35 nautical miles (65 km) off Cape Wrath, Sutherland, Scotland with the loss of 15 of her crew. Survivors were rescued by Royal Navy ship HMS Birkenhead along with local trawlers.
- The High Court of Australia ruled by majority that judicial appointments made by Parliament should be for life.
- The Australian period war drama The Loyal Rebel, directed by Alfred Rolfe, was released through Australasian Films. The film, set against the Eureka Rebellion of 1854, is now considered lost.
- At 2:20 p.m., a Santa Fe railroad car carrying 250 barrels of natural gasoline exploded at the passenger terminal in Ardmore, Oklahoma, destroying most of downtown Ardmore and killing 43 people, including Patrolman Charles Smith of the Ardmore Police Department.
- Died:
  - Thompson Capper, 51, British army officer, commander of the 7th Infantry Division during World War I, recipient of the Distinguished Service Order, Order of the Bath, and Order of St Michael and St George; died from wounds sustained during the Battle of Loos (b. 1863)
  - Richard Garnons Williams, 59, Welsh army officer and rugby player, member of the first Welsh national rugby team in 1881, commanding officer of the Royal Fusiliers in 1885 and 1914; killed in action at the Battle of Loos (b. 1856)
  - Harry Minto, 50, Superintendent of the Oregon State Penitentiary; shot by escaped inmate (b. 1864)
  - George Thesiger, 46, British army officer, recipient of the Order of St Michael and St George and the Order of the Bath; killed in action at the Battle of Loos (b. 1868)

== September 28, 1915 (Tuesday) ==
- Battle of Loos – The Allied offensive hit a lull despite British Field Marshal John French suggesting to French General Ferdinand Foch that a power assault could force a gap in the German line. Foch felt the maneuver would be difficult to co-ordinate and that the British First Army was in no position for further attacks, having lost over 20,000 casualties.
- Second Battle of Champagne – The French nearly break through the German line and capture a key German reserve area behind it.
- Battle of Es Sinn – British and Indian forces under command of Charles Townshend defeated Ottoman forces at a strategic point in the Tigris and Euphrates rivers, setting the Allied forces for siege on Kut in what is now Iraq.
- The Anglo-French Financial Commission and an American syndicate led by J.P. Morgan & Co. reached a credit agreement for $500 million over five years, at that time the largest single loan in financial history.
- Born: Ethel Rosenberg, American spy, convicted along with Julius for sharing state secrets with the Soviet Union; in New York City, United States (executed, 1953)
- Died:
  - Georges Peignot, 43, French type designer and type founder, founder of G. Peignot et Fils; killed in action near Givenchy-en-Gohelle, France (b. 1872)
  - Saitō Hajime, 71, Japanese samurai, main leader in the Boshin War and member of the Satsuma Rebellion during the Meiji era in Japan (b. 1844)

== September 29, 1915 (Wednesday) ==
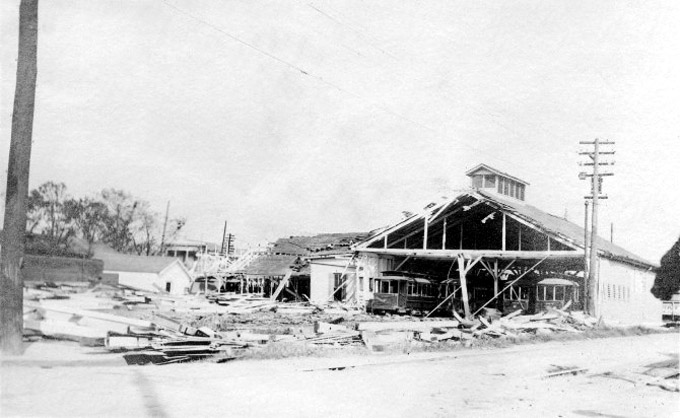
Smashed streetcar barn in New Orleans following a hurricane.

- A hurricane struck Louisiana, killed 279 people causing $13 million in damages ($239 million us 2005 USD). While New Orleans was hit where 23 residents were killed, the worst was in Plaquemines Parish, Louisiana where some 200 residents drowned when levees broke. The town of Ruddock, Louisiana was also destroyed, with 58 residents dead, and became a ghost town. It was the deadliest storm the state experienced until Hurricane Betsy 50 years later.
- Actions of the Hohenzollern Redoubt – A German attempt to recapture Hohenzollern Redoubt was called off due lack of suitable weaponry.
- Second Battle of Champagne – German counterattacks recaptured much of the ground lost, forcing French General Joseph Joffre to suspend the offensive until soldiers were resupplied with more ammo.
- At least 6,000 Ottoman troops were dispatched to break Armenian resistance in Urfa, Turkey.
- The German Eighth Army was formally dissolved, only to have the name renewed three months later by its replacement army.
- The No. 2 Canadian Overseas Siege Artillery Battery was established on Prince Edward Island to serve the Canadian Expeditionary Force on the Western Front.
- Shinano Railway extended the Ōito Line in the Nagano Prefecture, Japan, with stations Hosono and Ikeda-Matsukawa serving the line.
- Born:
  - Vincent DeDomenico, American entrepreneur, one of the inventors of Rice-A-Roni and co-founder of the Napa Valley Wine Train; in San Francisco, United States (d. 2007)
  - Oscar Handlin, American historian, recipient of the Pulitzer Prize for History for The Uprooted, leading contributor to the Immigration and Nationality Act of 1965; in New York City, United States (d. 2011)
  - Fred Page, Canadian sports executive, president of the Canadian Amateur Hockey Association, vice president of the International Ice Hockey Federation, chairman of the Canadian Junior Hockey League; as Frederick Page, in Port Arthur, Ontario, Canada (d. 1997)

== September 30, 1915 (Thursday) ==
- Serbian Army private Radoje Ljutovac became the first soldier in history to shoot down an enemy aircraft with ground-to-air fire.
- French destroyer Branlebas struck a mine and sank in the North Sea between Dunkerque, France, and Nieuwpoort, Belgium.
- Siege of Mora – Captain Ernst von Raben, commander of German defenses in Mora, Kamerun was wounded by an artillery barrage. His second in command, Lieutenant Siegfried Kallmeyer, took over active command while Raben recovered.
- Imperial Trans-Antarctic Expedition – After being trapped in ice for close to 10 months, the polar exploration ship Endurance experienced pressure from the surrounding ice in what expedition leader Ernest Shackleton described in his log as "the worst squeeze we had experienced." Within a month, the damage to the hull by the ice would be so great Shackleton would order the ship to be abandoned.
- The University of British Columbia held its first day of lectures at the old campus of McGill University College in Vancouver, after the university postponed plans to build a new campus at Point Grey due to economic turmoil caused in part by World War I. A total 379 students enrolled in the three faculties: Arts, Applied Science and Agriculture.
- Born: Lester Maddox, American politician, 75th Governor of Georgia; in Atlanta (d. 2003)
- Died: Heinrich Schneidereit, German weightlifter, gold and bronze medalist at the 1906 Olympic Games, was killed in action near Thionville, France (b. 1884)
