= Casablanca Fair of 1915 =

1915 French commercial exposition in Morocco

Casablanca Fair, 1915
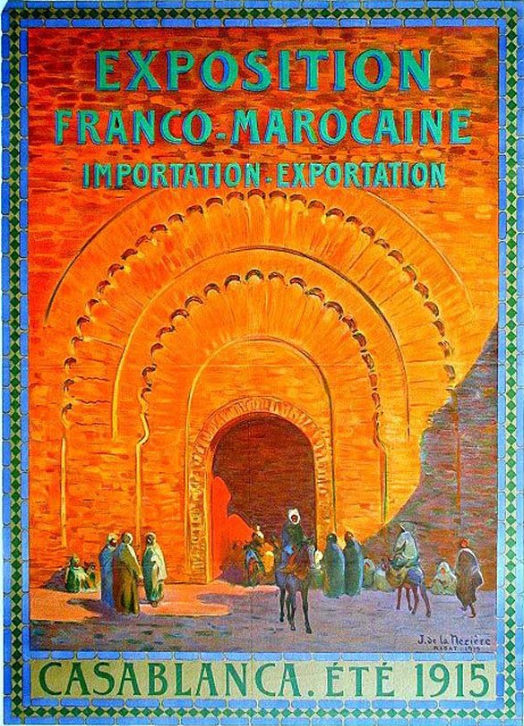
- Original poster advertising the fair
- Date: 5 September 1915–5 November 1915
- Location: Casablanca, Morocco
- Participants: French authorities in the protectorate of Morocco; Moroccan craftsmen

The Casablanca Fair of 1915 (also known as the 1915 Casablanca Franco-Moroccan Fair or Exposition Franco-Marocaine) was a commercial exposition held by the French authorities at Casablanca in the protectorate of Morocco from 5 September to 5 November 1915. It was intended to encourage better economic ties between France and Morocco and as a demonstration of French power in the region. Goods from across Morocco were displayed at the fair and allowed French scholars to assess the state of the craft industry in Morocco. Their findings resulted in the establishment of training centres for Moroccan craftsmen in an attempt to encourage the industry.

== Origins ==
Attendants of the fair

The French had held a protectorate over Morocco since the Treaty of Fes in 1912 and were engaged in pacification and occupation of much of the country through military operations such as the Zaian War. The French resident-general, Hubert Lyautey, wished to open up the Moroccan markets to French goods and to better integrate Moroccan industries with those of France. The Casablanca fair was the first of several held to further this aim and to demonstrate French power in the region.

== The fair ==
The Pavilion of Engineering and one of the trenches

The fair was held between 5 September and 5 November despite the ongoing First World War and indeed occurred during the "deadliest moment of the war in France". The organisation of the fair was managed by the French authorities, though they encouraged the participation of the Moroccan population in the fair itself. Separate pavilions were erected to house displays representative of the products of each region of Morocco and for at least one government body, there were also tents erected in which Moorish merchants displayed their goods and various curiosities. The fair was also the catalyst for the creation of a fire department for Casablanca.

Pavilion	Display
Rabat-Salé region	Carpets, blankets, embroideries, rush mats, inlaid wood
Mogador region	Wooden engravings, chased silver jewellery
Marrakesh region	Carpets (from Houz and the High Atlas), Arab and Berber jewellery, brassware, wooden items and pottery
Meknes region	Carpets and blankets (from the Middle Atlas), embroidery and painted wood
Fes region	Sculpted and painted wooden furniture, engraved stuccos, embroidered silk banners and emblems, needle embroidery, lacework, faience mosaics, Berber carpets and glazed pottery
Chaouia region	Not known
General Administration of Public Instruction (government body)	Drawings produced by pupils of the new grammar and vocational schools
Engineering	Including a display of trenches used in military engineering

== Outcomes ==
Chaouia region pavilion

One objective of the fair was to inventory all the items that Morocco imported from Europe so that the French could plan to provide these directly in the future. In addition scholars used the fair to undertake studies on all the resources that Morocco could offer, including craft industries, and to better organise their exploitation. The scholars concluded that earlier Moroccan pieces were of better quality. They considered that the height of the craft industry had passed with modern items showing a decline in quality of design, raw materials, pigmentation and skill of the craftsmen. Encouraged by examples of work produced by Moroccan children in the new grammar and vocational schools (displayed at the fair by the General Administration of Public Instruction), the French authorities believed that a new generation of craftsmen could be trained at such establishments. They subsequently ran adult education programmes and apprenticeship schemes at the schools, in which Moroccans were taught to copy older examples of craftware collected by French specialists. Two "Inspection Offices of the Native Craft Industry" were established at Fes and Rabat with attached museums and workshops to serve as centres for new Moroccan craftware production. Replicas of older items were housed in the new museums and also sent to exhibitions in Morocco and abroad where they were offered for sale.
