= 1915 DEI Championship =

The 1915 DEI Championship season (known as the Koloniale-Tentoonstellings-Beker for organisation reasons) was the inaugural season of the Dutch East Indies DEI Championship football competition since its establishment in 1914.

It was contested by 4 teams, and Batavia won the championship.

== Semi finals ==
July 31, 1915

Semarang	2 (aet) 1	Bandung
Vink 12' (own goal) van Der Worm 48'		Trebels 95'

Bondsterrein, Batavia
August 01, 1915

Batavia	1 – 0	Soerabaja
J.W Fischer 55'

Bondsterrein, Batavia

== Final ==
August 02, 1915

Batavia	2 – 0	Semarang
Davies Jr. 10'; H.E Heuer 63'

Bondsterrein, Batavia
