= Parunak Ferukhan =

Armenian politician and violinist (1884 - 1915)

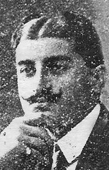
- Born: 1884; Istanbul, Ottoman Empire
- Died: 1915 (aged 30–31)

Parunak Ferukhan (Armenian: Բարունակ Ֆէրուխան, 1884 – 1915) was a famed violinist, officer in the Finance Ministry and Official of the Bakırköy (Makriköy) administration. He was a victim of the Armenian genocide.

== Life ==
Of Armenian descent, Parunak Ferukhan was born in Istanbul, Ottoman Empire. During the Armenian genocide, he belonged to the second convoy with only two survivors that left Çankırı on 19 August 1915. He was jailed in Ankara on 20–24 August and killed en route to Yozgat.
