= July 1915 =

Month of 1915

<<	July 1915					>>
Su	Mo	Tu	We	Th	Fr	Sa
				1	2	3
4	5	6	7	8	9	10
11	12	13	14	15	16	17
18	19	20	21	22	23	24
25	26	27	28	29	30	31

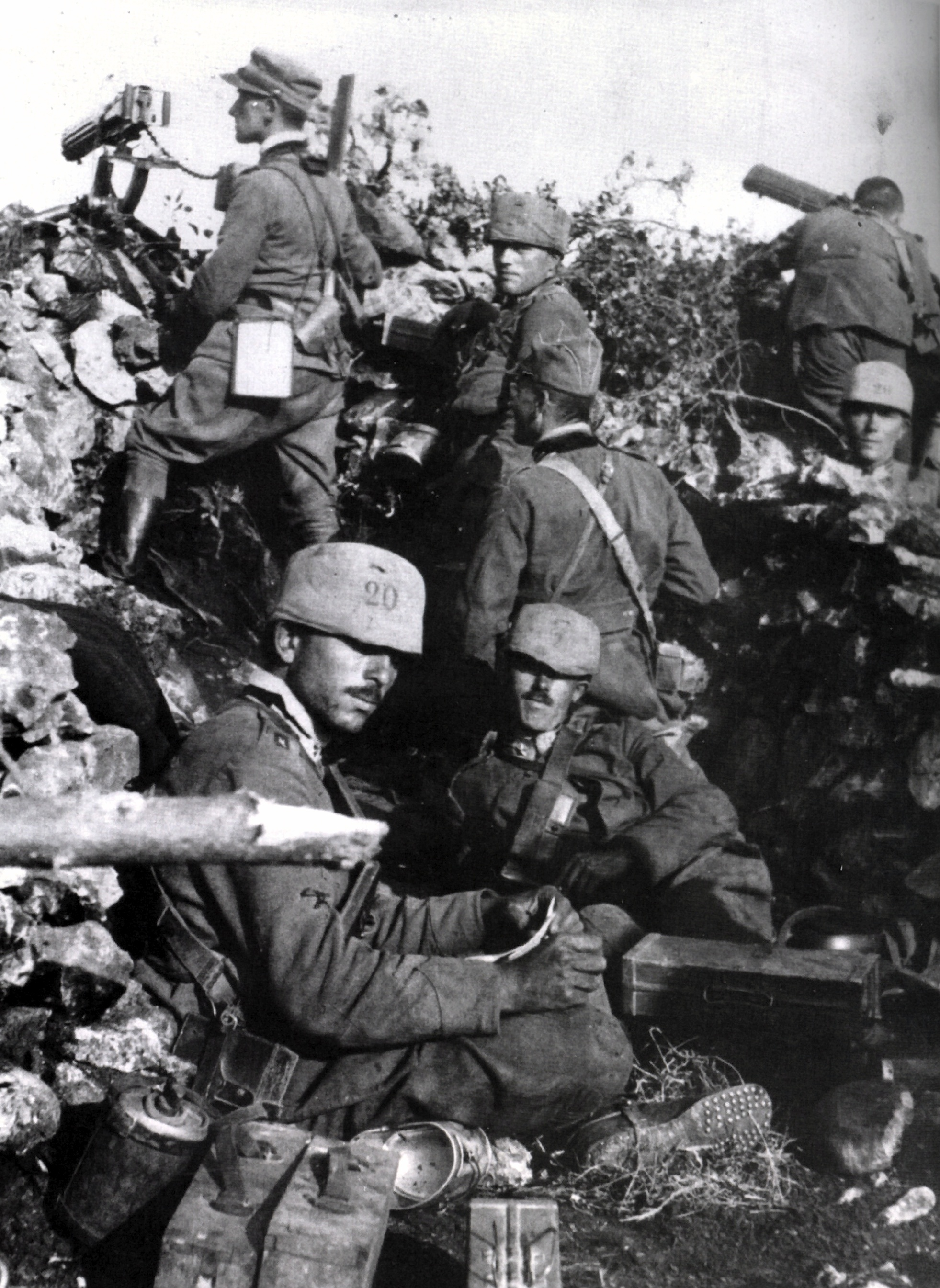
Italian soldiers during the Second Battle of the Isonzo on the Italian Front.

The following events occurred in July 1915:

== July 1, 1915 (Thursday) ==
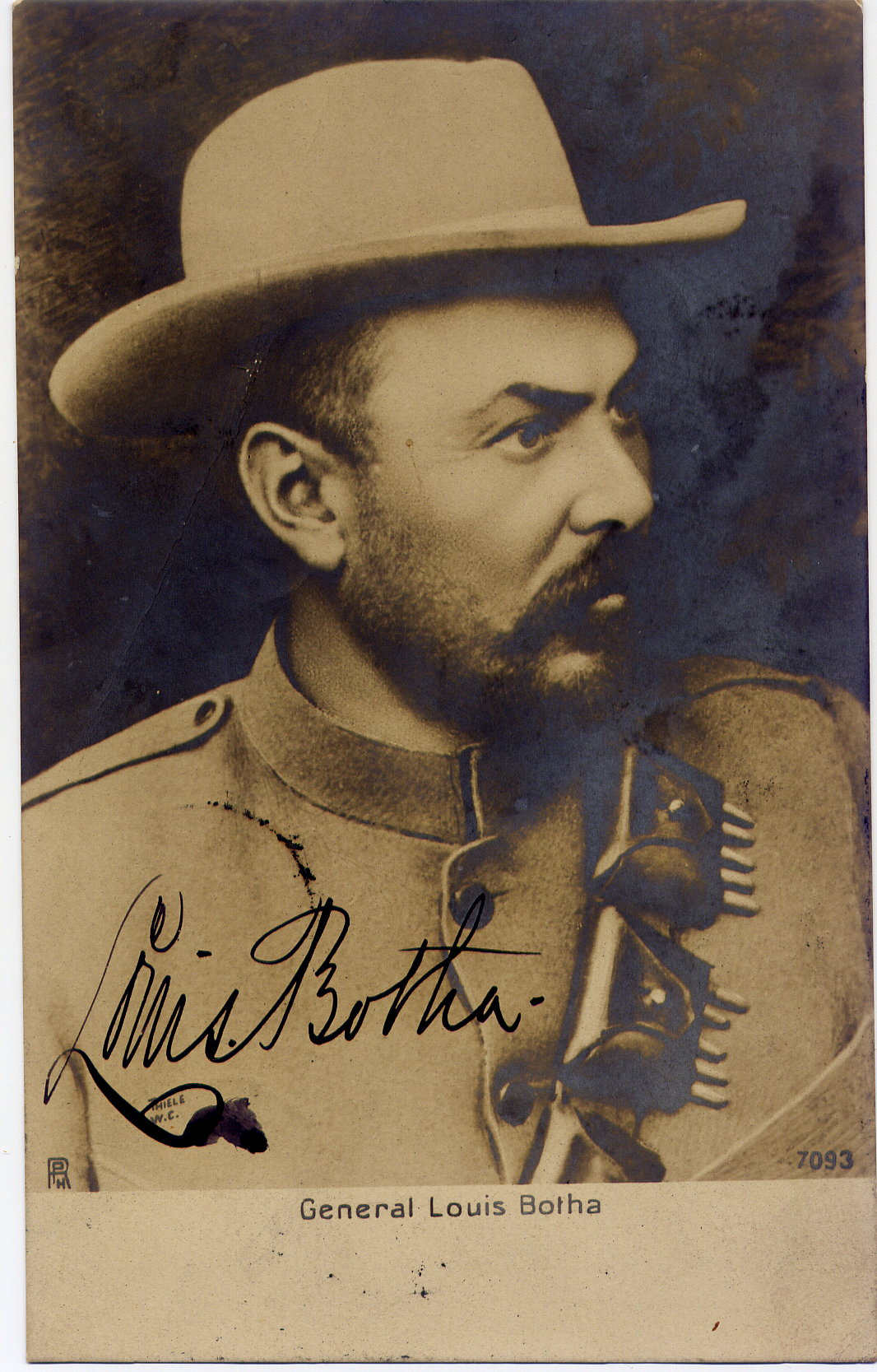
General Louis Botha

War ace Kurt Wintgens

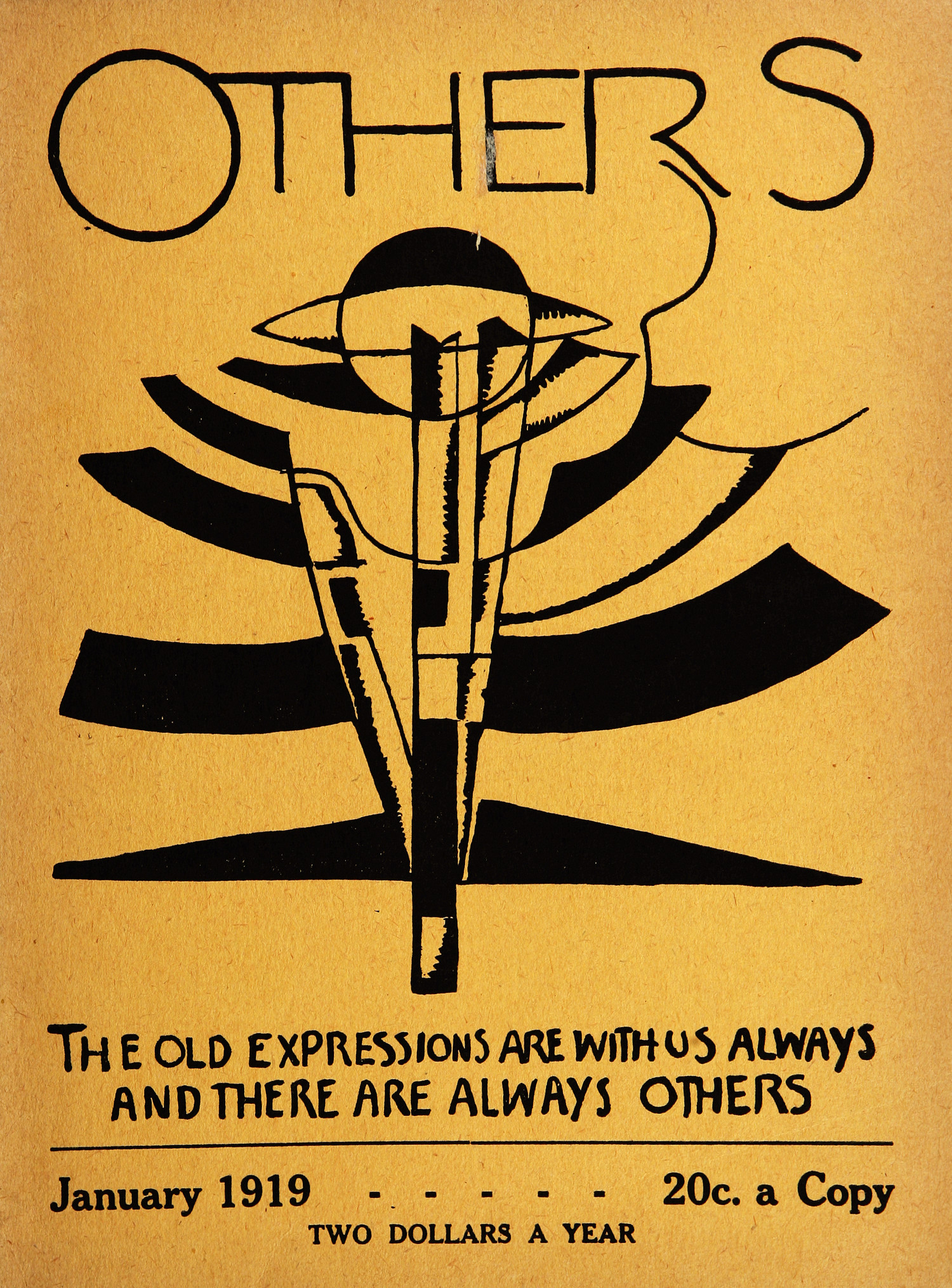
Others literary magazine

- Forces with the Union of South Africa under command of General Louis Botha defeated German colonial forces at the Battle of Otavi in German South West Africa with assistance from Canada, Great Britain, Portugal and Portuguese Angola. The result would soon put an end to German resistance in southwest Africa and allow South Africa to occupy the region until March 1990.
- Battle of Gully Ravine — Ottoman forces under command of officer Faik Pasa and Albay Refet launched counterattacks to prevent British forces from encircling their right flank on the Gallipoli peninsula. During the intense, bloody fighting, Captain Gerald Robert O'Sullivan and Corporal James Somers of the Royal Inniskilling Fusiliers were both awarded the Victoria Cross for recapturing a trench taken by the Ottomans during a counterattack.
- German fighter pilot Kurt Wintgens became the first person to shoot down another plane using a machine gun equipped with synchronization gear, which allowed him to shoot through a turning propeller without hitting its blade. His victory started a period referred to as the "Fokker Scourge," as Fokker M.5 airplanes outfitted with machine guns took a heavy toll on Allied aircraft over the Western Front. Wintgens himself would down two more enemy planes in July.
- A Russian naval squadron under command of Rear Admiral Mikhail Bakhirev intercepted a message that a German squadron was laying mines around Åland in the Baltic Sea and moved to engage them.
- A second inquiry into the sinking of the RMS Lusitania was held at the urging of survivor Joseph Marichal who threatened to sue the Cunard ocean line for "poor handling" of the disaster, but was soon discredited when the British government found unfavourable details of his background and leaked them to the press.
- The French Navy seaplane carrier Pas-de-Calais was commissioned, the first paddle steamer to serve as an aviation vessel.
- The United States Department of the Navy established an Office of Naval Aeronautics, the first formal recognition of naval aviation within the United States Navy.
- The Royal Australian Survey Corps of the Australian Army was established.
- The Burg Giebichenstein University of Art and Design was established in Halle, Germany.
- The United States Forest Service combined the Jemez National Forest and Pecos National Forest in northern New Mexico to establish the Santa Fe National Forest.
- The Moapa National Forest was absorbed into the Toiyabe National Forest in Nevada.
- New York City established in the Child Welfare Board.
- American poet Alfred Kreymborg launched Others: A Magazine of the New Verse with Skipwith Cannell, Wallace Stevens, and William Carlos Williams. The magazine — which featured poetry, other writing and visual art — ran until 1917.
- The association football club Avenir Beggen was formed as "Daring Beggen" before changing to its current name a year later, in Beggen, Luxembourg City, Luxembourg.
- The association football club Japonês was formed in Rio de Janeiro, but renamed a year later as Olaria after the neighbourhood it was established in to attract more supporters.
- Lierne Municipality, Norway was divided into the municipalities of Nordli Municipality and Sørli Municipality. Also, Leirfjord Municipality was created when it was split off from Stamnes Municipality. All three were amalgamated again in 1964.
- The Wharton Reef Lighthouse officially began operating in Princess Charlotte Bay off Cape York Peninsula, Queensland, Australia. It was deactivated in 1990 and donated to the region's museum, making it the only surviving lighthouse during the "Golden Age of Australian Lighthouses" from 1913 to the early 1920s.
- Born:
  - Nguyễn Văn Linh, Vietnamese state leader, General Secretary of the Communist Party of Vietnam from 1986 to 1991; as Nguyễn Văn Cúc, in Hưng Yên, Tonkin, French Indochina (present-day Vietnam) (d. 1998)
  - Rolf Hauge, Norwegian army officer, commander of the No. 10 Commando unit with the Free Norwegian forces during World War II, recipient of the St. Olav's Medal with Oak Branch, Defence Medal, Military Cross and France and Germany Star; in Bergen, Norway (d. 1989)
  - Jean Stafford, American writer, recipient of the Pulitzer Prize for the anthology The Collected Stories of Jean Stafford; in Covina, California, United States (d. 1979)
  - Willie Dixon, American blues musician, known for his collaborations with Muddy Waters, Howlin' Wolf, Chuck Berry and Buddy Guy; as William Dixon, in Vicksburg, Mississippi, United States (d. 1992)
- Died: William M. Walton, 83, American politician, major in the Confederate Army, 13th Texas Attorney General (b. 1832)

== July 2, 1915 (Friday) ==
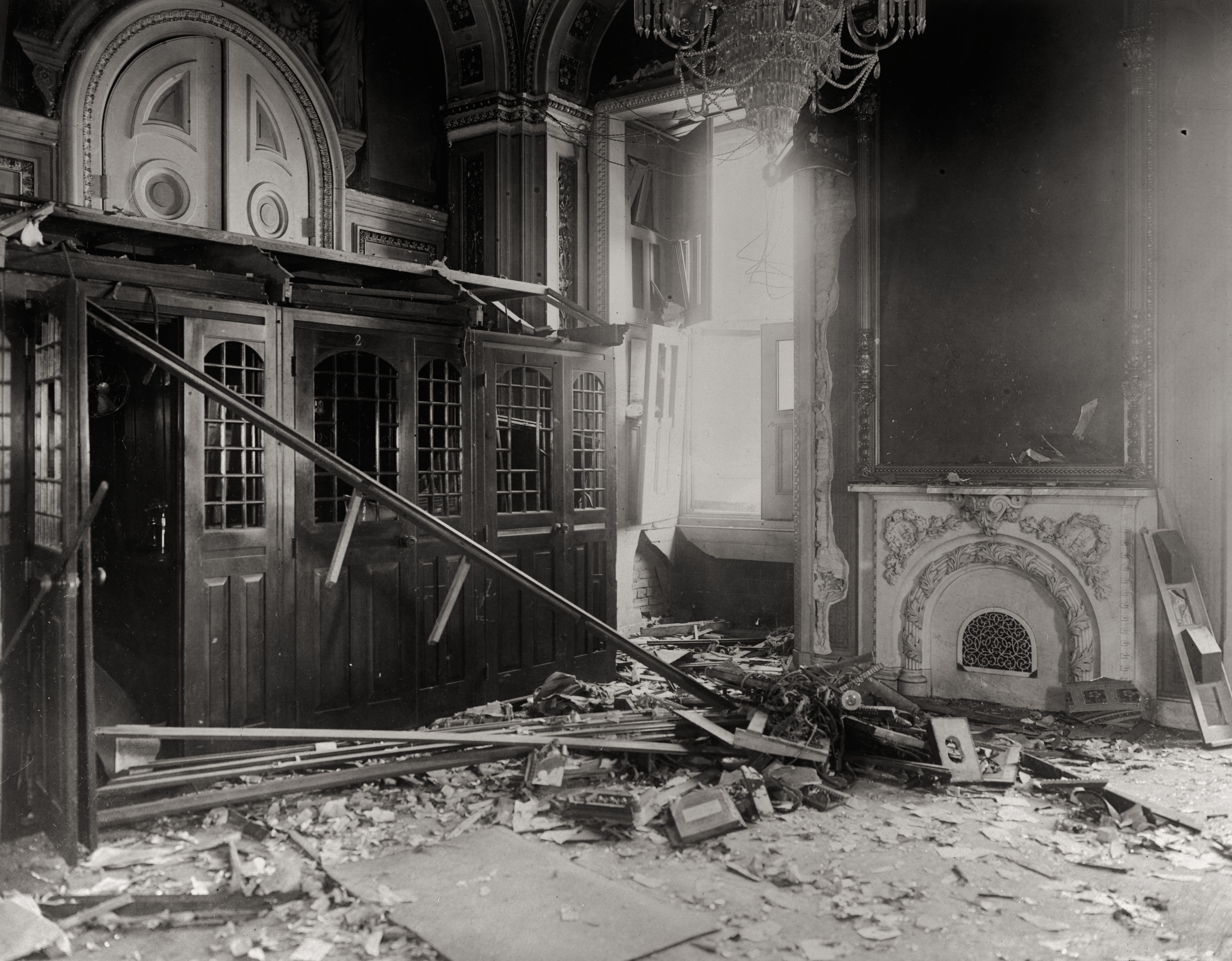
Senate reception room bombed at the United States Capitol building.

- The British Parliament passed the Munitions of War Act to address the shortage of artillery shells in Great Britain needed for the war effort. David Lloyd George was appointed Minister of Munitions to oversee the effort.
- The Russian naval squadron of the Baltic Sea attacked a German squadron laying mines in the Baltic Sea at the Battle of Åland Islands. The German cruiser SMS Albatross was hit and ran aground, with 27 sailors dead and another 49 wounded. German cruisers SMS Prinz Adalbert and Prinz Heinrich sailed to assist the German squadron, but British submarine HMS E9 torpedoed Prinz Adalbert and forced it to limp to shore.
- Battle of Gully Ravine — The Ottoman 1st Division led by Lieutenant Colonel (Kaymakam) Cafer Tayyar Eğilmez staged a second counterattack and got within 30 metres of British trenches before losses became unbearable to continue. Ottoman commanding officer Faik Paşa then ordered Ottoman to dig defenses to prevent further losses, violating orders from General Otto Liman von Sanders. As a result, Paşa was replaced with Mehmet Ali Paşa.
- German-American anarchist Eric Muenter planted a timed bomb with three sticks of dynamite in the Senate reception room of the United States Capitol, Washington, D.C., which detonated just before midnight with no casualties. Muenter had tried to plant the bomb in the Senate chamber but found it locked. He sent a letter under an alias to The Washington Star after the bombing, explaining he hoped the explosion would "make enough noise to be heard above the voices that clamor for war. This explosion is an exclamation point in my appeal for peace."
- The 69th Battalion of the Canadian Expeditionary Force was established.
- The submarine Guacolda was launched by the Fore River Shipyard at Quincy, Massachusetts. Originally, the submarine was commissioned to the Royal Navy but because of United States neutrality during World War I, it was commissioned instead to the Chilean Navy.
- The Canungra railway line opened between Logan Village and Canungra, Queensland, Australia.
- The symphonic composition Taras Bulba by Czech composer Leoš Janáček was published.
- Born: Hal Wagner, American baseball player, catcher for the Philadelphia Athletics, Boston Red Sox, Detroit Tigers, and Philadelphia Phillies from 1937 to 1949; as Harold Edward Wagner, in East Riverton, New Jersey, United States (d. 1979)
- Died: Porfirio Díaz, 84, Mexican state leader, 29th President of Mexico (b. 1830)

== July 3, 1915 (Saturday) ==
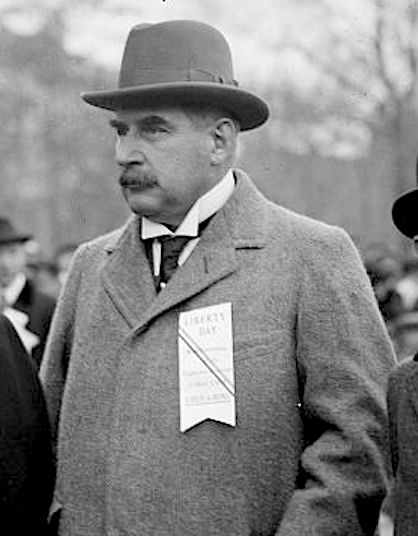
J. P. Morgan Jr.

- After setting off a bomb at the United States Capitol, German-American anarchist Eric Muenter fled to New York City where he planted another homemade bomb on munitions ship SS Minnehaha. He then traveled to the home of banker J. P. Morgan Jr. in Glen Cove, New York, with more dynamite and two revolvers. He invaded the house intending to take the family hostage and force the Morgan company to stop financing munitions shipments to Europe for the Allied war effort in exchange for their release. However, Morgan was at home along with his wife as well as their butler and the three were able to subdue Muenter despite the anarchist shooting Morgan twice in the groin and leg (he fully recovered within a month). Muenter was arrested by the New York police department immediately afterward.
- The La Jolla Recreational Center opened at a children's playground and recreation center in the La Jolla neighbourhood of San Diego.
- Born: Ted Swales, South African air force officer, member of the No. 582 Squadron during World War II, recipient of the Victoria Cross and Distinguished Flying Cross; as Edwin Essery Swales, in Inanda, KwaZulu-Natal, South Africa (killed in action, 1945)

== July 4, 1915 (Sunday) ==
- Ottoman troops and Arab tribesmen attacked the British-held town of Lahij in South Arabia (now Yemen).
- A force of six German Navy airships attempted an attack on a Royal Navy squadron conducting an aerial reconnaissance in the German Bight. Bad weather prevented each side from attacking the other. The heavy seas made it impossible for British seaplanes to launch and pursue the airships, and the airships could not get close enough to fire on the ships.
- German aviator Gunther Plüschow escaped from an officers' prisoner-of-war camp at Donington Hall in England, successfully making his way home to Germany, the only combatant in either World War to do so.
- The first border raid by bandits was made on a ranch in Cameron County, Texas, as part of a campaign to create civil unrest large enough for the U.S. border states to secede to Mexico.
- The recently opened rail station in Elizabethtown, Pennsylvania had the honor of hosting the famous Liberty Bell as it was transported across the United States to be displayed at the Panama–Pacific International Exposition in San Francisco.

== July 5, 1915 (Monday) ==
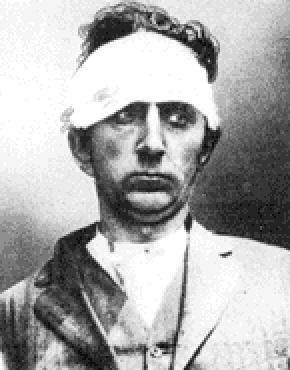
Eric Muenter, bomber, after his arrest

- Battle of Gully Ravine — A final attempt to recapture ground from the British ended in failure for Ottoman Empire forces defending the Gallipoli peninsula. Facing losses that were four times more than the British, with estimates ranging between 14,000 and 16,000 casualties, General Otto Liman von Sanders caved to Ottoman officers pleas to stop the assaults and ended the bloodiest part of the Gallipoli campaign.
- British forces gave up Lahij, South Arabia to Ottoman troops and fell back to Al Kawr (now part of Yemen).
- German-American anarchist Eric Muenter committed suicide while in New York police custody, shortly after he was identified as being behind the bombing three days earlier in Washington, D.C. His estranged wife reported to police that she learned through a letter sent from Muenter before his arrest that he had hid a bomb on the SS Minnehaha and that it was set to explode on July 7.
- The Hotel Macdonald, one of Canada's chateau-styled hotels, opened in Edmonton.
- A rail station was opened in Leeuwarden, Netherlands to serve the Harlingen–Nieuweschans railway. It closed twice, first in 1940 before it was reopened in 1954. It closed again in 2018.
- Born:
  - John Woodruff, American track athlete, gold medalist at the 1936 Summer Olympics; in Connellsville, Pennsylvania, United States (d. 2007)
  - Babe Paley, American socialite and magazine editor, wife to CBS president William S. Paley; as Barbara Cushing, in Boston, United States (d. 1978)

== July 6, 1915 (Tuesday) ==
- Battle of Rufiji Delta — After concealing from British ships for nearly eight months within the jungles surrounding the Rufiji River in German East Africa (now Tanzania), German cruiser SMS Königsberg exchanged fire with British monitor ships HMS Mersey and HMS Severn and forced both vessels to withdraw.
- German fighter pilot Oswald Boelcke claimed his first victory, by shooting down a Blériot aircraft while flying an Albatros two-seater biplane, setting him on to eventually become a flying ace.
- English composer Edward Elgar premiered his composition Polonia at a charity relief concert for Polish war victims in Queen's Hall, London. The composition mixed Polish music influences as a patriotic tribute to the people, similar to Carillon that premiered in December 1914 to celebrate the struggles of Belgium during the first months of World War I.
- Born: Leonard Birchall, Canadian air force officer, commander of the 413 Squadron during World War II, recipient of the Distinguished Flying Cross and the Order of the British Empire; in St. Catharines, Ontario, Canada (d. 2004)
- Died:
  - Lawrence Hargrave, 65, British Australian aeronautics engineer, developed many prototypes used for hang gliding and paragliding; died of peritonitis (b. 1850)
  - John O'Reily, 68, Australian clergy, first Bishop of the Roman Catholic Diocese of Port Pirie and second Archbishop of the Roman Catholic Archdiocese of Adelaide (b. 1846)

== July 7, 1915 (Wednesday) ==
- Sinking of the RM Amalfi — The Italian cruiser RM Amalfi was returning to Venice after a bombardment of the Austrian coastal defences near Trieste, under escort. At dawn, when about 15 miles from Venice, the ship was attacked by UB-15, only one torpedo was fired and in a very short time the cruiser sank with about 150 of her complement of 550.
- First Battle of the Isonzo — An attempt by Italy to break through the Austro-Hungarian line in the Alps failed. Despite superior numbers on the Italian side, Austria-Hungary had better equipment, highly trained soldiers, and superior geographic advantages. The Italians sustained over 14,000 casualties while the Austro-Hungarians received 9,950 casualties.
- Armenian genocide — Swedish diplomat Cossva Anckarsvärd, stationed in Constantinople, released a two-page report to Stockholm stating "persecutions of the Armenians have reached hair-raising proportions" and concluded the solution to the "Armenian question" within the Ottoman Empire would "consist of the extermination of the Armenian nation."
- Italian cruiser Amalfi was torpedoed and sunk at Pola, Austria-Hungary by German submarine SM UB-14 with the loss of 67 of her 684 crew.
- French General Joseph Joffre held the first military conference for the Allies — known as the Chantilly Conferences —in Chantilly, Oise, France, shortly after Italy entered the conflict against the Central Powers.
- Sinhalese militia captain Henry Pedris was executed in British Ceylon for inciting race riots, a charge later proved false. He became a hero of the Sri Lankan independence movement.
- A bomb planted by the late German-American anarchist Eric Muenter exploded on munitions ship SS Minnehaha despite efforts by crew to locate it. Fortunately, the bomb was not near the munitions depot that the ship was carrying and damage was minimal. The ship itself would not survive World War I, and would be sunk by a German U-boat in 1917.
- The Guards Reserve Corps of the Imperial German Army was reestablished after it had been disbanded six months earlier.
- The II Royal Bavarian Reserve Corps for the Imperial German Army was disbanded when its headquarters was upgraded to the South Army for action on the Eastern Front.
- American Civil War veteran and landowner John N. Ballard deeded a small plot that had been part of the battlefield of Chantilly, Virginia, for the purpose of allowing persons or groups the opportunity to erect monuments or markers in remembrance to those who fought in the battle, leading to the eventual establishment of Ox Hill Battlefield Park in October.
- The Women's Christian College was established in Chennai, India.
- The first edition of the Norwegian newspaper Østerdalens Arbeiderblad was published, primarily as the organ for the Labour Party of Norway.
- Born:
  - Margaret Walker, American poet and writer, part of the African American literary movement in Chicago, author of Jubilee; in Birmingham, Alabama, United States (d. 1998)
  - Reynaldo Guerra Garza, American judge, first Mexican American to be appointed to the United States Court of Appeals; in Brownsville, Texas, United States (d. 2004)

== July 8, 1915 (Thursday) ==
- The Army of the Bug of the Imperial German Army (named after Bug River in Poland) was established to serve on the Eastern Front.
- The Women's Peace Army was established in Melbourne in protest to Australia's involvement in World War I.
- Born:
  - Lowell E. English, American marine officer, commander of the 3rd Marine Division during World War II, the Korean War and the Vietnam War; in Fairbury, Nebraska, United States (d. 2005)
  - Neil D. Van Sickle, American air force officer, commander of United States Air Force operations in Taiwan during the Second Taiwan Strait Crisis in 1958; in Minot, North Dakota, United States (d. 2019)

== July 9, 1915 (Friday) ==
- Victor Franke, commander of the German forces in German South West Africa, along with 2,000 of his men surrendered to the Allies.
- The first casualty in the Mexican border raids occurred when a raider was shot dead by a ranch hand during a raid on King Ranch near Kingsville, Texas.

== July 10, 1915 (Saturday) ==
- Battle of Manzikert — A Russian force of 22,000 troops attempted to capture strategic hills west of the town of Malazgirt, Turkey, assuming defenses were weak. In actuality, a force of 40,000 Ottoman troops was defending the area.
- Japanese Government Railways extended the Ban'etsu East Line in Fukushima Prefecture, Japan with stations Akai and Ogawagō serving the line.
- Died: Vazha-Pshavela, 53, Georgian poet, known for his epic poems including Host and Guest (b. 1861)

== July 11, 1915 (Sunday) ==
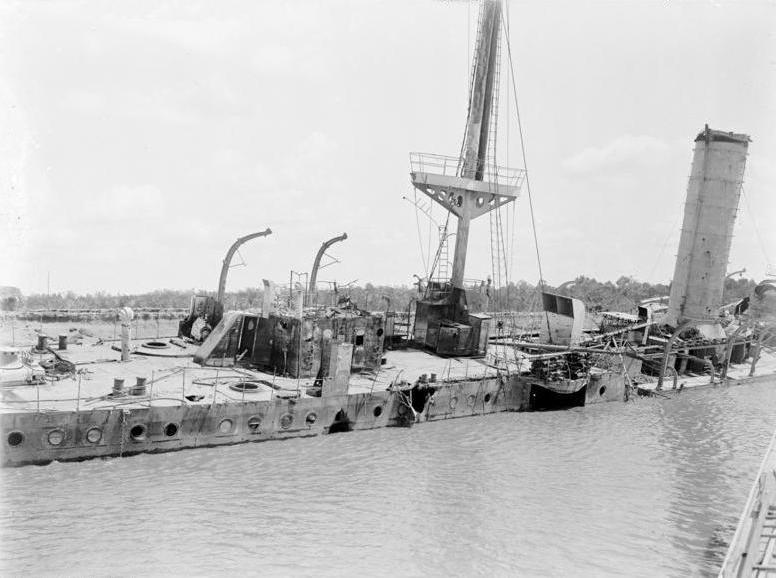
Wreck of SMS Königsberg after the Battle of Rufiji Delta in German East Africa.

- Battle of Rufiji Delta — German cruiser SMS Königsberg was scuttled in the Rufiji River, German East Africa following battle damage inflicted by Royal Navy ships HMS Mersey and HMS Severn. Thirty-three crew men were killed and another 45 were wounded, including Captain Max Looff.
- Pablo Falcon, a local deputy of Mexican-American heritage, was shot and killed by Mexican rebels in Brownsville, Texas. He was the first victim of the Plan of San Diego, a plan to create unrest among border towns in Texas during the Mexican Revolution.
- Cardinal Francis Bourne dedicated the St Benedict's Church in Warrington, England.
- The weekly Lithuanian liberal paper News of Riga, edited by founder Liudvikas Jakavičius, ceased publication after six years of operation.
- Born: Cecil Isbell, American football player, quarterback for the Green Bay Packers from 1938 to 1942, NFL Champion in 1939; in Houston, United States (d. 1985)
- Died: Thomas J. Walsh, 39, Canadian politician, one of the main lobbyists for the amalgamation of Edmonton and Strathcona, Alberta, served as alderman for Edmonton City Council from 1912 to 1913; died of a stroke (b. 1875)

== July 12, 1915 (Monday) ==
- Gallipoli campaign — A force of 7,500 soldiers from 155th and 157th Brigades of the British 52nd Division attacked the centre of the line along Achi Baba Nullah ("Bloody Valley") on the peninsula. The assault gained very little ground and resulted in 2,500 casualties; along with 600 from the Royal Naval Division and 800 men from a supporting French unit. The Ottoman Empire had 9,000 casualties and 600 prisoners.
- The Ferrovia Centrale Umbra rail line opened in Umbria, Italy.

== July 13, 1915 (Tuesday) ==
- The Central Powers renewed their offensive on the Eastern Front and were able to push the entire southern wing of the Russian line back 160 km (99 mi) to the Bug River in Galicia (now southern Poland).
- The Castle Mountain Internment Camp for 660 Canadian citizens deemed enemy aliens under the War Measures Act was established in Banff National Park, Canada.
- The second regiments of the 1st and 2nd Foreign Regiments merged to form the single Marching Regiment of the Foreign Legion.
- Born: Robert L. McNeil Jr., American chemist, creator of the pain reliever Tylenol; in Bethel, Connecticut, United States (d. 2010)
- Died: Richard Mohun, 51, American explorer, commercial agent for the United States in Angola and the Belgian Congo, lead the expedition to lay telegraph wire from the Nile to Lake Tanganyika in Central Africa; died of a fever (b. 1864)

== July 14, 1915 (Wednesday) ==
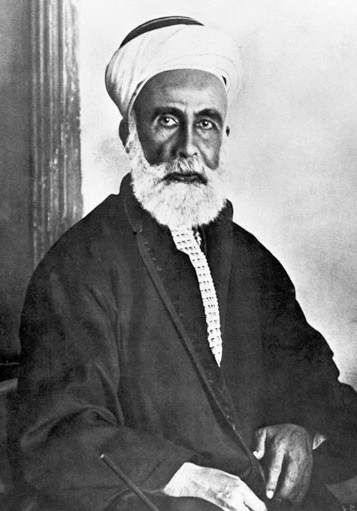
Hussein bin Ali, Sharif of Mecca

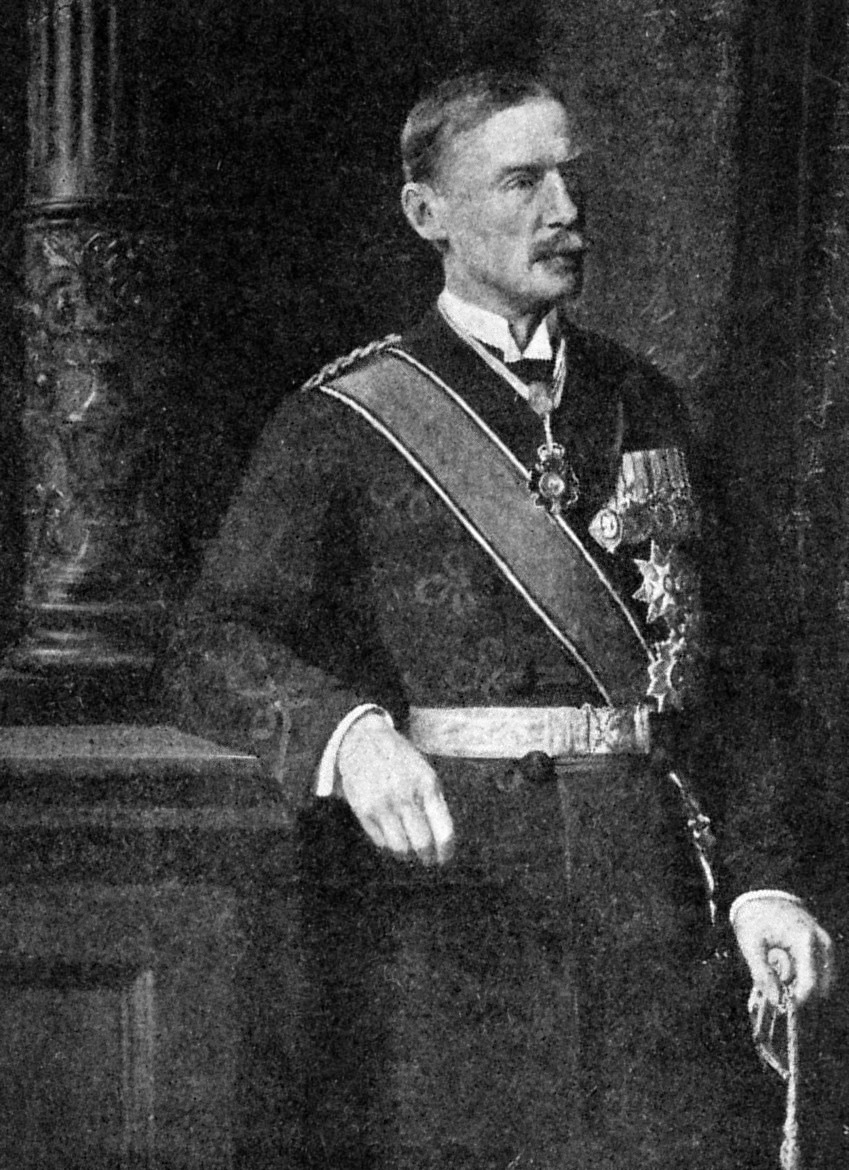
Henry McMahon, High Commissioner of Great Britain

- Hussein bin Ali, Sharif of Mecca, and Henry McMahon, British High Commissioner in Egypt, began a letter correspondence on steps to achieve Arab independence from the Ottoman Empire.
- The VII Corps was formed under command of Lieutenant-General Thomas Snow as part of the British Third Army.
- The 1st Australian Heavy Artillery Battery was established to support the First Australian Division at Gallipoli.
- The association football club América was formed in Natal, Rio Grande do Norte, Brazil.
- The African Police Medal for Meritorious Service for recognition of service for non-European police officers serving in the British African colonies. The medal was awarded until 1938 when it was replaced with the Colonial Police Medal and the Colonial Police Long Service Medal.
- Born:
  - Louis Gonzaga Mendez Jr., American army officer, commander of the 508th Infantry Regiment of the 82nd Airborne Division during World War II, three-time recipient of the Bronze Star Medal and Distinguished Service Cross; in Denver, United States (d. 2001)
  - John W. Mitchell, American air force officer, commander of the 70th Fighter Squadron during World War II and leader of Operation Vengeance, three-time recipient of the Distinguished Flying Cross, Legion of Merit, Navy Cross and Bronze Star Medal; in Enid, Mississippi, United States (d. 1995)
- Died: Elizabeth Barrows Ussher, 41, English missionary, one the key witnesses of the Armenian Genocide; died of typhus (b. 1873)

== July 15, 1915 (Thursday) ==
- The oldest active branch of the National Association for the Advancement of Colored People was formed in New Orleans.
- Armenian leader Krikor Zohrab was murdered between July 15 and July 20 in the outskirts of Urfa during the height of the Armenian genocide.
- The Brownhill Creek Recreation Park, located south of Adelaide, South Australia, was established to protect the most unique and sensitive portions of the Brown Hill Creek.
- The Morialta Falls Reserve was established northeast of Adelaide, Australia.
- Shinano Railway extended the Ōito Line in the Nagano Prefecture, Japan, with station Hotaka serving the line.
- Literary magazine Blast put out its second and last edition. The cover featured a woodcut by Wyndham Lewis (who also edited the magazine) and contained a short play by Ezra Pound and poetry by T. S. Eliot. Plans for a further issue fell through as World War I placed personal and public pressures on all artists involved, even though Lewis had plans as late as 1919 to publish.
- German composer Max Reger completed one of his last compositions, Der Einsiedler, in Jena, Germany, and dedicated it to conductor Philipp Wolfrum. It would premier the following year after his death.
- Wolf Point, Montana was incorporated.
- Born:
  - Albert Ghiorso, American physicist, discovered a record 12 elements for the periodic table of elements; in Vallejo, California, United States (d. 2010)
  - Harrison Storms, American aeronautical engineer, project manager of the Apollo command project from 1961 to 1967; in Chicago, United States (d. 1992)
  - Scott Cutlip, American academic, developer of public relations education; in Buckhannon, West Virginia, United States (d. 2000)

== July 16, 1915 (Friday) ==
- Battle of Manzikert — The Ottoman Third Army under command of Abdul Kerim Pasha counterattacked invading Russian forces. With the Ottomans outnumbering the Russians 3–1, they were able to force the invading force back to Malazgirt, Turkey.
- The Yaskawa Electric Corporation was established in Kitakyushu, Japan as an electric parts manufacturer. The company eventually became known throughout the 20th century for its mobile control devices and an innovator in robotics and information technology in the 21st century.
- The National Honor Society of the Boy Scouts of America — Order of the Arrow — was founded by Scouts field director E. Urner Goodman.
- L. Frank Baum released his ninth Land of Oz book, The Scarecrow of Oz. It was said to be Baum's favorite of all the Oz books.
- Born:
  - David Campbell, Australian poet, known for poetry collections such as The Miracle of Mullion Hill; in Adelong, New South Wales, Australia (d. 1979)
  - Annie Llewelyn-Davies, British politician, first woman to hold Chief Whip in the House of Lords from 1974 to 1979; as Annie Patricia Parry, in Birkenhead, England (d. 1997)
- Died: Ellen G. White, 87, American religious leader, co-founder of Seventh-Day Adventism, most translated American author (b. 1827)

== July 17, 1915 (Saturday) ==
- Russian forces on the central-north of the Eastern Front sustained up to 80 percent of losses and were forced to retreat across the Narew River in Galicia (now northeastern Poland) to avoid annihilation.
- William Creen, an inmate at the state prison in Milledgeville, Georgia, tried to kill Leo Frank, who was serving a commuted life sentence for the murder of 13-year old Mary Phagan. Creen slashed Frank's throat using a kitchen butcher knife but Frank survived the attack. According to The New York Times, Creen told authorities he attacked Frank "to keep the other inmates safe from mob violence, Frank's presence was a disgrace to the prison, and he was sure he would be pardoned if he killed Frank."
- The 1st and 2nd Australian Siege Artillery Batteries left Melbourne to serve on the Western Front.
- Australasian Films released its first feature film The Hero of the Dardanelles, a war film directed by Alfred Rolfe and starring Guy Hastings. The film recreated the landing at Gallipoli using 1,000 actual Australian soldiers from Liverpool Camp at Tamarama Beach in Sydney. The film was popular at the box office and screened to the Prime Minister of Australia and Premier of Victoria. A copy was later placed in the archives of the Australian Federal Parliament.
- Born:
  - Fred Ball, American movie executive and actor, executive board member of Desilu Productions, brother of comedian Lucille Ball; as Frederick Henry Ball, in Jamestown, New York, United States (d. 2007)
  - Arthur Rothstein, American photographer, best known for his coverage of the Dust Bowl during the Great Depression; in New York City, United States (d. 1985)
- Died: Francis Delafield, 73, American physician, first president of the Association of American Physicians (b. 1841)

== July 18, 1915 (Sunday) ==
- Second Battle of the Isonzo — A force of 250,000 troops from the Italian Second and Third Armies engaged in brutal hand-to-hand combat with 78,000 Austro-Hungarian troops, who were better equipped and holding well-defended positions in the Alps.
- Italian cruiser Giuseppe Garibaldi was torpedoed and sunk in the Adriatic Sea 5 nautical miles (9.3 km) southeast of Dubrovnik, Serbia by Austro-Hungarian submarine SM U-4 with the loss of 53 of her 559 crew.
- Born: Phil Graham, American news executive, publisher for The Washington Post, husband to Katharine Graham; as Philip Leslie Graham, in Terry, South Dakota, United States (d. 1963)
- Died: Frank Tarr, 27, British rugby player, centre for the England national rugby union team from 1909 to 1913; killed in action at the Second Battle of Ypres (b. 1887)

== July 19, 1915 (Monday) ==
- French fighter pilot Georges Guynemer shot down his first enemy aircraft, a German Aviatik, while flying a Morane-Saulnier L monoplane nicknamed Vieux Charles. Guynemer would eventually earn the flying ace for downing 54 more enemy aircraft.
- Albert Jacka became the first Australian to win the Victoria Cross during World War I.
- U.S. Navy battleship Oklahoma was severely damaged by fire at Camden, New Jersey. She was subsequently repaired and re-entered service in May 1916.
- Besant Theosophical College opened in Madras as an affiliate of the University of Madras, the oldest active college in the Indian state of Andhra Pradesh.
- The United States Forest Service broke up the Paulina National Forest in Oregon and merged it with three other national forests in the region.
- A rail station was opened in North Wollongong, New South Wales to serve the South Coast line in Australia.
- The Board of Invention and Research of the Royal Navy met for the first time in London to recruit scientists and engineers to assist with emerging technical and logistical challenges in wartime naval operations.
- The Australian silent war drama Within Our Gates premiered throughout the country, being the first film to depict the Gallipoli campaign.
- The Taos Society of Artists was established in Taos, New Mexico, where it would be instrumental in bringing the Taos art colony to the international stage.
- Born: Katherine Sanford, American medical researcher, lead researcher in cancer and Alzheimer's disease research for the National Cancer Institute; as Katherine Koontz, in Chicago, United States (d. 2005)

== July 20, 1915 (Tuesday) ==
- Battle of Manzikert — The Ottoman Army pushed the Russians out of Malazgirt, Turkey.
- The 28th Indian Brigade, supported by two British artillery companies under command of A. M. S. Elsmie attacked and retook the town of Sheikh Othman, South Arabia (now Yemen) after it fell to the Ottoman Empire weeks earlier.
- German submarine SM U-23 was torpedoed and sunk in the Atlantic Ocean by British submarine HMS C27 with the loss of 24 of her 34 crew.
- A strike at the Bayonne refinery in New Jersey became violent after Mayor Pierre Prosper Garven of Bayonne, New Jersey allowed the city's police force to be used to enforce picket lines set by Standard Oil of New Jersey (the mayor was also on the oil company's payroll as an attorney). Following an initial walk-out of 1,200 refinery works over pay and working conditions, a riot broke out on the picket lines between the strikers and the police, leading to the shooting death of 19-year-old striker John Sterancsak.
- The Grimsby and Immingham Electric Railway opened an electric railway station in Immingham, England. The station was closed in 1955.

== July 21, 1915 (Wednesday) ==
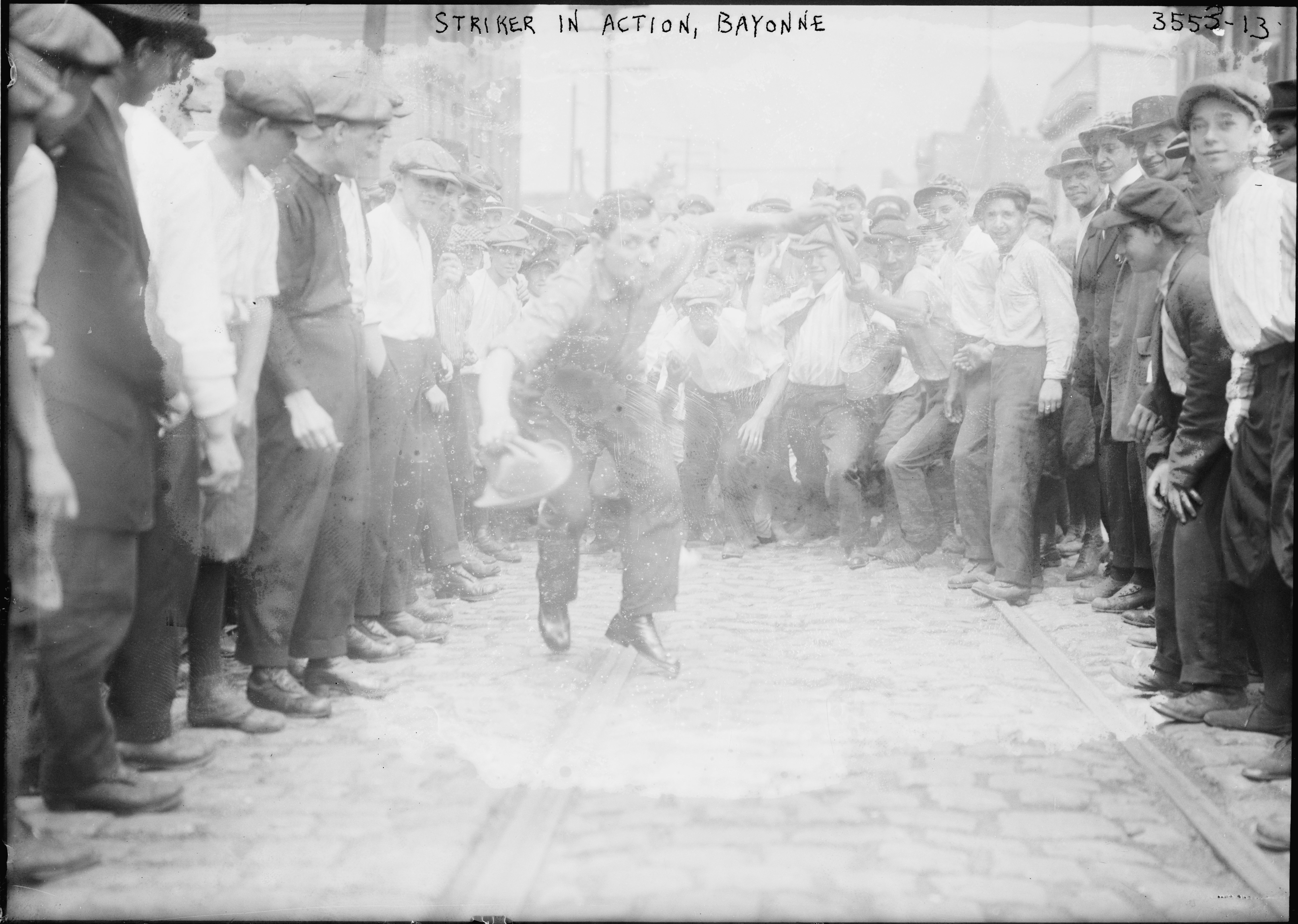
Strikers at the Bayonne refinery, New Jersey.

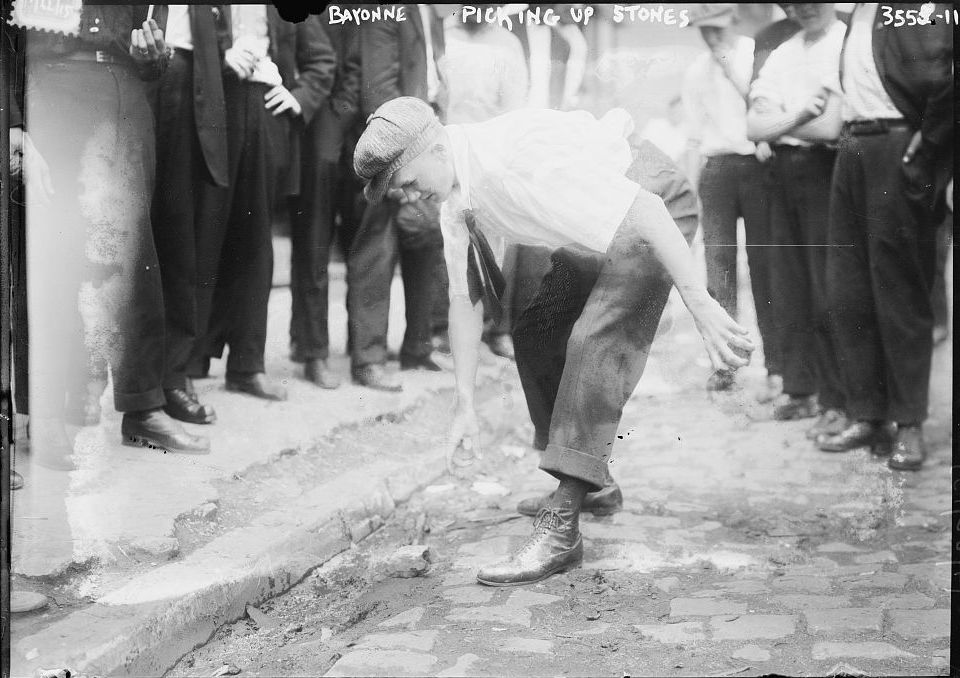
A striker at Bayonne refinery, New Jersey.

- U.S. President Woodrow Wilson issued Germany an ultimatum in the third and final letter related to the sinking of the RMS Lusitania in May, warning any subsequent sinkings would be perceived by the United States as "deliberately unfriendly".
- British submarine HMS E14 slipped through an anti-submarine net in the Dardanelles.
- Violence stemming from the shooting death of a striking worker on July 20th escalated during the strike at the Bayonne refinery when a mob attacked and attempted to set fire to the Tidewater Petroleum in Bayonne, New Jersey. Violence would continue for another week, resulting in the deaths of five more strikers as well as several injuries and significant property damage caused by arson. Order was eventually restored. Investigation onto the initial riot led to the superintendent of the Tidewater refinery and 32 guards being charged for inciting a riot.
- Ross Sea party — Ice pressure on the sides of the drifting British polar ship Aurora in the Ross Sea damaged the vessel's rudder beyond repair, forcing first officer Joseph Stenhouse to consider abandoning ship but he belayed the order when ice movements shifted the following day.
- Voters in Alberta, Canada voted in favor of prohibiting the sale and distribution of alcohol within the province, the second time the region went dry (the first prohibition was lifted in 1892 when Alberta was part of the Northwest Territories). Just over 58,000 voted in favour of prohibition while 37,000 voted against. Prohibition was implemented July 1, 1916.
- Seventeen-year old British soldier Herbert Burden was executed for desertion, the youngest ever to be executed by the British Army. Burden testified during his court-martial that he had not deserted his unit after he had been discharged from a British Hospital on June 26, but he was visiting a friend in a neighboring unit who had lost a comrade in battle and intended to return to his post, arguably making it a case of absent without leave. He was pardoned posthumously by the British government in 2006 along with 300 other executed soldiers.

== July 22, 1915 (Thursday) ==
- The Great Retreat was ordered on the Eastern Front as forces with the Central Powers crossed the Vistula River in Galicia (now Poland).
- Battle of Manzikert — Bad communications delays kept Russian general Nikolai Yudenich from learning that the Russians had retreated from Manzikert, Turkey. In all, the Russian force lost between 7,000 and 10,000 men.
- The British government introduced the Elections and Registration Act which required all British citizens aged 15 to 65 to be registered by August 15.
- The British Army established the 119th Brigade.
- The Breton-Prétot machine was approved to by the French War Department to cut through barbed wire defenses on the Western Front.
- Died: Sandford Fleming, 88, Canadian engineer and surveyor, developed the time zone system (b. 1827)

== July 23, 1915 (Friday) ==
- No. 21 Squadron of the Royal Flying Corps was established at Netheravon, England.
- The North Western State Railway opened the Wazirabad–Narowal Branch Line in British India (now Pakistan), connecting Wazirabad with Narowal.
- Born:
  - Hugo Bagnulo, Uruguayan association football player and manager, member of the Uruguay national football team in 1942, led the Peñarol club to five national league titles from 1973 to 1975 and 1982 to 1983; as Víctor Hugo Bagnulo Fernández, in Montevideo, Uruguay (d. 2008)
  - Horace Hahn, American lawyer, assistant to Robert H. Jackson during the Nuremberg trials; in Colorado, United States (d. 2003)

== July 24, 1915 (Saturday) ==
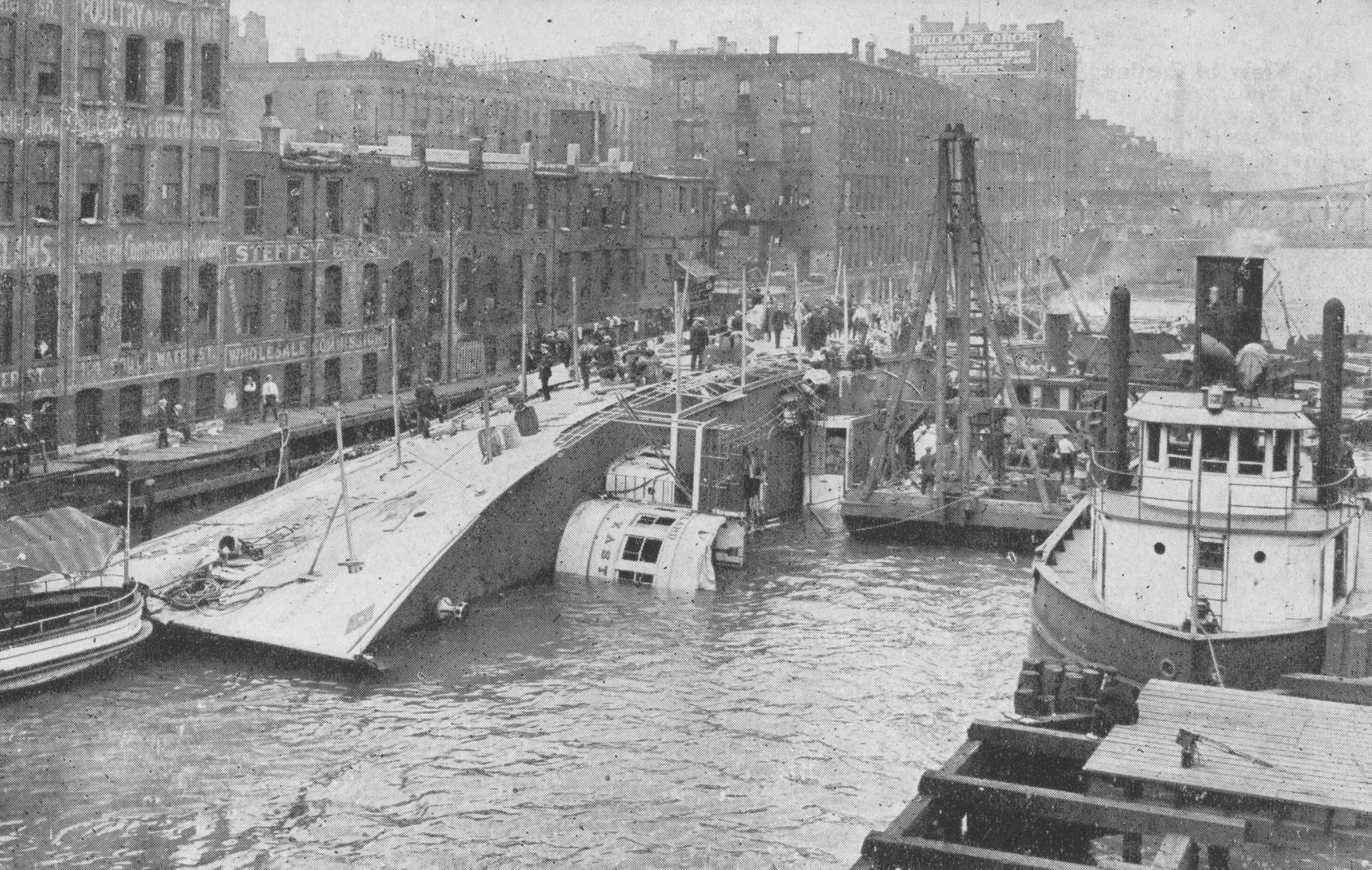
Capsized boat Eastland in Chicago River.

- The steamer Eastland capsized in central Chicago, with the loss of 844 lives.
- German submarine SM U-36 was sunk in the North Atlantic by British Q-ship (armed merchant vessel) HMS Prince Charles with the loss of 18 out of the 34 crew. It was the first time a militarized merchant ship was able to sink an enemy vessel without the aid of a fellow submarine.
- Born:
  - Ralph S. Locher, Romanian American politician, 50th mayor of Cleveland; in Moreni, Kingdom of Romania (present-day Romania) (d. 2004)
  - Hillel Kook, Lithuanian-Israeli activist, prominent member of the Irgun Zionist paramilitary group; in Kriukai, Russian Empire (present-day Lithuania) (d. 2001)

== July 25, 1915 (Sunday) ==
- Second Battle of the Isonzo — Members of the Italian Second and Third Armies occupied the Cappuccio Wood south of Mount San Michele, which had been used as bridgehead by the Austro-Hungarian army, but failed to hold the mountain itself.
- Royal Flying Corps pilot Lanoe Hawker shot down three German aircraft while on patrol over Passchendaele, Belgium, including the aircraft piloted by Hans Roser, and became the first airman to be awarded the Victoria Cross for combat against enemy airplanes.
- Mexican border raiders burned a railway bridge belonging to St. Louis, Brownsville and Mexico Railway in the Rio Grande Valley, Texas, leading Texas Governor James E. Ferguson to order a unit of Texas Rangers to assist local law in keeping order in the area.
- The association football Olympic Club was formed in Barbacena, Brazil.
- Born:
  - Enrique Fernando, Filipino judge, 13th Chief Justice of the Supreme Court of the Philippines; in Malate, Manila, Philippine Islands (present-day Philippines) (d. 2004)
  - Joseph P. Kennedy Jr., American air naval officer, son of Joseph P. Kennedy Sr. and Rose Kennedy, member of Operation Aphrodite, recipient of the Navy Cross; in Hull, Massachusetts, United States (killed in action, 1944)
  - Milton Rosen, American space engineer, lead developer of the Viking and Vanguard rockets for the Apollo program; in Philadelphia, United States (d. 2014)
- Died: Virginie Amélie Avegno Gautreau, 56, French socialite, famously modeled for the painting Portrait of Madame X by John Singer Sargent (b. 1859)

== July 26, 1915 (Monday) ==
- French submarine Mariotte was scuttled in the Dardanelles, with 31 crew taken as prisoners of war. The vessel attempted to slip through the same anti-submarine net British sub HMS E14 was able to do five days earlier, but failed to negotiate it and subsequently was forced to surface. Shore batteries spotted the sub and shelled the conning tower before it could submerge.
- German destroyer SMS V188 was torpedoed and sunk in the North Sea by Royal Navy submarine HMS E16 with the loss of five of her crew.
- The 2nd Division was established as part of the First Australian Imperial Force to fight at Gallipoli, with the 5th, 6th, and 7th Brigades serving in it.
- The submarines Tegualda and Rucumilla were launched by Fore River Shipyard at Quincy, Massachusetts. Originally, both submarines were commissioned to the Royal Navy but because of United States neutrality during World War I, they were commissioned instead to the Chilean Navy.
- Norwegian clipper Cimba was wrecked in the Gulf of Saint Lawrence due to heavy fog while en route from Matane, Quebec, to Liverpool, the last ship ever to be wrecked in the area.
- The first edition of South African national newspaper Die Burger was published.
- Born: K. Pattabhi Jois, Indian yoga master, developed the Ashtanga yoga style in Mysore, India; as Krishna Pattabhi Jois, in Hassan district, British India (present-day India) (d. 2009)

== July 27, 1915 (Tuesday) ==
- Battle of Kara Killisse — Following Russia's defeat from the Battle of Manzikert, Russian General Nikolai Yudenich regrouped the retreating Caucasus Army and engaged the pursuing Ottoman Third Army at Kara Killisse (now Ağrı, Turkey). During the advance, the Ottomans captured the Russian-held town of Muş, Turkey.
- Vilbrun Guillaume Sam, President of Haiti, ordered the execution of his predecessor Oreste Zamor along with 160 other political prisoners in Port-au-Prince. The brutal mass execution became the tipping point for the nation after months of violent oppression under the regime, resulting in a citizen uprising the same day. Sam took refuge in the French embassy but a mob broke in the following day and killed him.
- Born:
  - Jack Iverson, Australian cricketer, batsman for the Australia national cricket team from 1950 to 1951; as John Iverson, in Melbourne, Australia (d. 1973)
  - Josef Priller, German air force officer, commander of the Jagdgeschwader 26 for the Luftwaffe during World War II, recipient of the Knight's Cross of the Iron Cross; in Ingolstadt, German Empire (present-day Germany) (d. 1961)

== July 28, 1915 (Wednesday) ==
- The United States occupation of Haiti began when U.S. President Woodrow Wilson authorized 330 U.S. Marines to land at Port-au-Prince to safeguard the interests of American businesses operating in the country, following the lynching and murder of Haitian president Vilbrun Guillaume Sam. The occupation would last until 1934.
- Norwegian ocean liner Trondhjemsfjord was torpedoed and sunk in the Atlantic Ocean northwest of Shetland, Great Britain by German submarine SM U-41. Her passengers and crew were rescued by a sailing ship.
- The Bayonne refinery strike in New Jersey ended as workers returned on promises of increased pay and the institution of an eight-hour day.
- British cruiser HMS Castor was launched at Cammell Laird at Birkenhead, England, and would see action during World War I and the Russian Civil War.
- The prototype of the Royal Aircraft Factory B.E.12 model was first flown at Farnborough Airport, England, and went to wide production in August to combat the Fokker airplanes used by the Imperial German Army.
- The British government created by Order in Council the Committee for Scientific and Industrial Research at the recommendation President of the Board of Education. The committee would was ordered to pursue establishing a permanent government organization dedicated to scientific research and innovation, and eventually formed the Department of Scientific and Industrial Research the following year.
- Born:
  - Dick Sprang, American comic book artist, best known for his artwork for Batman during the Golden Age of Comic Books; as Richard Sprang, in Fremont, Ohio, United States (d. 2000)
  - Frankie Yankovic, American polka musician, known of polka hits "Just Because" and "Blue Skirt Waltz"; as Frank Yankovic, in Davis, West Virginia, United States (d. 1998)
  - Charles H. Townes, American physicist, recipient of the Nobel Prize in Physics for inventing the maser; in Greenville, South Carolina, United States (d. 2015)
  - Richard Kerry, American civil servant, lawyer for the Bureau for United Nations Affairs, father to Cameron and John Kerry; in Brookline, Massachusetts, United States (d. 2000)

== July 29, 1915 (Thursday) ==
- The British Elections and Registration Act was passed by both houses of British Parliament and received royal assent.
- Irish Republicans, led by Patrick Pearse, took over the Gaelic League at its Dundalk conference, causing Douglas Hyde to resign as its president.
- Adolfo Munoz, a Mexican living in Cameron County, Texas, was arrested in San Benito, Texas, for "scheming to rob a local bank and having connections with armed raiders." A masked lynch mob abducted Munoz from police custody, and he was found dead the following day from multiple gunshot wounds. It was unknown whether the lynch mob were local vigilantes or Mexican rebels.
- Born:
  - Francis Sargent, American politician, 64th Governor of Massachusetts; in Hamilton, Massachusetts, United States (d. 1998)
  - Bruce R. McConkie, American religious leader, member of the Quorum of the Twelve Apostles of the Church of Jesus Christ of Latter-day Saints from 1972 to 1985; in Ann Arbor, Michigan, United States (d. 1985)
- Died: Martina Bergman-Österberg, 65, Swedish-British educator and activist, promoter of fitness among women and founder of the Ling Association; died of cancer (b. 1849)

== July 30, 1915 (Friday) ==
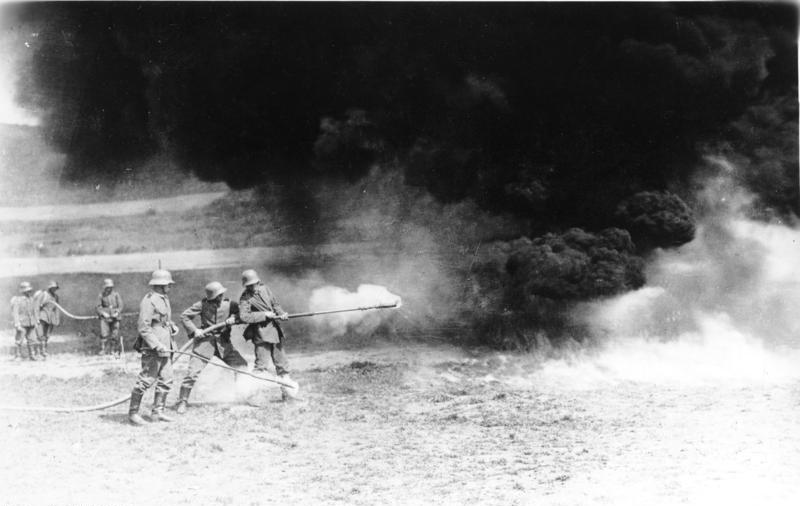
German flamethrowers on the Western Front.

- Armenian genocide — Armenian partisan fighter and political leader Hampartsoum Boyadjian was hanged along with 12 other comrades at a prison in Kayseri, Turkey.
- The flamethrower was used for the first time in combat, with German forces using it to flush out British soldiers from their trenches at Hooge, Belgium.
- British cargo ship Iberian was torpedoed and sunk in the Atlantic Ocean 9 nautical miles (17 km) southwest of the Fastnet Rock by German submarine SM U-28 with the loss of seven crew.
- Lieutenant Charles Becker of the New York City Police Department was executed by electrocution for the 1912 murder of gambler Herman Rosenthal. It was the first time an American police officer had received the death penalty.
- The Iwate Light Railway was extended in the Iwate Prefecture, Japan, with stations Kashiwagidaira and Masuzawa serving the line.

== July 31, 1915 (Saturday) ==
- Battle of Kara Killisse — The Russian Caucasus Army routed the Ottoman Third Army at Kara Killisse (now Ağrı, Turkey), using 20,000 reinforcements from Cossack units.
- Battle of Jastków — The Imperial Russian Army and Polish Legions clashed at the village of Jastków in what is now eastern Poland, the largest battle between the two armies.
- Lamington National Park was established in the McPherson Range that runs between Queensland and New South Wales in Australia. The park was named after Lord Lamington, former Governor of Queensland.
- The Joshin Electric Railway extended the Jōshin Line in the Gunma Prefecture, Japan, with station Niiya serving the line.
- The town of Raceland, Kentucky, was incorporated.
- Born: Herbert Aptheker, American historian, author of the seven-volume series Documentary History of the Negro People; in New York City, United States (d. 2003)
- Died: Billy Geen, 24, Welsh rugby player, member of the Oxford and Wales national rugby union team from 1910 to 1913; killed in action at Hooge, Belgium (b. 1891)
