= Secretary Kerry =

Secretary Kerry may refer to:

- John Kerry, the 68th U.S. Secretary of State
- Cameron Kerry, brother of John Kerry and acting U.S. Secretary of Commerce from June 1–26, 2013
