= Rosemary Forbes Kerry =

American nurse, American Girl Scout leader, and social activist

- Born: Rosemary Isabel Forbes; October 27, 1913; Paris, France
- Died: November 14, 2002 (aged 89); Manchester-by-the-Sea, Massachusetts, U.S.
- Spouse: Richard Kerry (m. 1941; died 2000)
- Children: Margaret; John; Diana; Cameron
- Parents: James Grant Forbes II; Margaret Tyndal Winthrop
- Relatives: Forbes family

Rosemary Isabel Kerry (née Forbes; October 27, 1913 – November 14, 2002) was an American nurse and social activist.

== Early life ==
Rosemary Isabel Forbes was born in Paris, France, to American parents. She was one of eleven children of James Grant Forbes II of the Forbes family and Margaret Tyndal Winthrop of the Dudley–Winthrop family. Margaret was a granddaughter of politician Robert Charles Winthrop.

== Work ==
She studied to be a nurse, and served in the Red Cross in Paris during World War II where she treated wounded soldiers at Montparnasse. According to her son John, Rosemary and her sister escaped from Paris on bicycles the day before the Nazis took the city. The sisters foraged their way across France while being shot at by German fighters, eventually making their way to Portugal before returning to the United States.

Rosemary also was a Girl Scout leader at the troop and council level in Groton, Massachusetts, for 50 years.

== Personal life ==
On February 8, 1941, she married Richard John Kerry in Montgomery, Alabama. Kerry was a graduate of Yale University and Harvard Law School. Richard and Rosemary met when Kerry took a sculpture class at the resort of Saint-Briac, where the Forbes family built the family estate. Together, they were the parents of four children:

- Margaret "Peggy" Kerry (b. 1941);
- John Kerry (b. 1943), the former United States Secretary of State and 2004 Democratic nominee for President of the United States;
- Diana Kerry (b. 1947);
- Cameron Kerry (b. 1950), a Boston lawyer who was a General Counsel of the U.S. Department of Commerce and an adjunct law professor at Suffolk Law School. Cameron Kerry is the father of two daughters, Diana and Elizabeth (Peggy).

Kerry died on November 14, 2002, at Manchester-by-the-Sea, Massachusetts. Upon her death, her son John inherited "trusts with $300,000 to $1.5 million in assets."
