= Abdul Kerim Pasha =

Ottoman commander

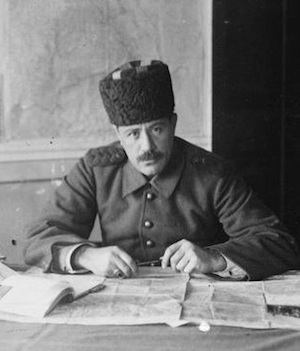
- Born: 1872; Salonica, Salonica Vilayet, Ottoman Empire
- Died: 16 October 1923 (aged 50–51); Constantinople, Turkey
- Education: Turkish Military Academy
- Military career
- Allegiance: Ottoman Empire
- Branch: Ottoman Army
- Service years: until 1922
- Rank: Lieutenant general
- Nickname: Öpelimi
- Commands: XI Corps, Right Wing of the Third Army, Third Army (deputy), General Rearguard, XX Corps, Third Army, delegate to Georgia (Tiflis), member of the First Board of the Military Appeal Court, member of the First Court-martial, president of the First Court-martial
- Conflicts: Italo-Turkish War; Balkan Wars; First World War; Battle of Manzikert (1915); Battle of Erzurum (1918); Battle of Koprukoy; Battle of Kara Killisse (1915); Erzurum offensive Turkish War of Independence

Abdul Kerim Pasha (Turkish: Abdülkerim Paşa; born 1872 and died October 16, 1923 (in Turkish)), also known as Abdülkerim Öpelimi, was an Ottoman commander on the Caucasus front of World War I.

== Career ==
Abdul Kerim was born in the city of Selanik. He married Ismail Qemali’s daughter. He graduated from the Military Academy in 1895 and captain from the War Academy on 25 December 1898.

Abdul Kerim Pasha's first battle was at the Battle of Manzikert on 25 December 1915 where he served as the Right Wing Group Commander against Russian general Pyotr Oganovsky. Abdul Kerim Pasha counterattacked against the Russians and defeated Oganovski during the battle, capturing the town of Manzikert. However Nikolai Yudenich, replaced Oganovski, as Russian commander, and counterattacked, re-taking Manzikert.

Yudenich defeated Kerim at the Battle of Kara Killisse. Pasha retreated to Manzikert.

In December 1916, he was shortly reinstated as commander of the XX Corps, which was sent to support Bulgaria and Germany on the Salonika front, but already in May 1917, the force was dismantled and recalled to Mesopotamia, where the troops were urgently needed. Kerim died on October 16, 1923, shortly after the liberation of Istanbul by the Turkish forces of Mustafa Kemal Pasha.

Abdul Kerim was married to Mevdet Vlora, the older daughter of Ismail Qemal Bej Vlora.
