= Richard Kerry =

American Foreign Service officer

- Born: Richard John Kerry; July 28, 1915; Brookline, Massachusetts, U.S.
- Died: July 29, 2000 (aged 85); Boston, Massachusetts, U.S.
- Burial place: Mount Auburn Cemetery
- Education: Yale University (BA); Harvard University (LLB)
- Occupations: Diplomat, lawyer
- Spouse: Rosemary Forbes (m. 1941)
- Children: Margaret; John; Diana; Cameron
- Relatives: Alexandra Forbes Kerry (granddaughter); Vanessa Bradford Kerry (granddaughter)

Richard John Kerry (July 28, 1915 – July 29, 2000) was an American Foreign Service officer and lawyer. He was the father of politician John Kerry and attorney Cameron Kerry.

== Early life ==
Kerry was born in Brookline, Massachusetts, to shoe merchant Frederick A. "Fred" Kerry and musician Ida Löwe, both immigrants of Austrian-Jewish origins. He had an elder brother Eric (born c. 1901) and an elder sister Mildred (born 1910). Fred and Ida had changed their names from "Fritz and Ida Kohn" to "Frederick and Ida Kerry" in 1900 and converted from Judaism to Catholicism in 1901 or 1902. They were baptized at the same time as Eric. Fred's brother Otto also embraced Catholicism and took on the "Kerry" name. The "Kerry" name, widely misinterpreted as indicative of Irish heritage, was reputedly selected arbitrarily: "According to family legend, Fritz and another family member opened an atlas at random and dropped a pencil on a map. It fell on County Kerry in Ireland, and thus a name was chosen." Leaving their hometown Mödling, a suburb of Vienna where they had lived since 1896, Fred, Ida, and Eric emigrated to the United States in 1905, living at first in Chicago and eventually moving to Brookline, Massachusetts, by 1915.

For a time, Fred Kerry was prosperous and successful in the shoe business. Because of his wealth, the family was able to afford to travel to Europe in the autumn of 1921, returning on October 21. A few weeks later, on November 15, Fred Kerry filed a will leaving everything to Ida and then, on November 23, walked into a washroom of the Copley Plaza Hotel in Boston and committed suicide by shooting himself in the head with a handgun. The suicide was front-page news in all of the Boston newspapers, reporting at the time that the motive was severe asthma and related health problems, but family members stated that the motive was financial trouble: "He had made three fortunes and when he had lost the third fortune, he couldn't face it anymore", according to Eric's daughter Nancy.

Richard Kerry attended Phillips Academy, graduated from Yale University in 1937, and received his law degree from Harvard Law School in 1940.

== Career ==
Kerry joined the United States Army Air Corps in World War II and volunteered to become a test pilot. He flew C-47s and B-29s until contracting tuberculosis, after which he was discharged. Upon returning to Massachusetts after convalescing in Colorado, he became an Assistant United States Attorney. He moved to Washington, D.C., in 1949, where he worked in the office of the General Counsel for the Navy Department.

Kerry entered the American foreign service and served as a diplomat in positions both in the United States and at foreign embassies, including in Germany and Norway. He also served as a lawyer in the Bureau of United Nations Affairs. Kerry authored The Star Spangled Mirror: America's Image of Itself and the World in 1990.

== Personal life ==
Kerry met nurse Rosemary Isabel Forbes in 1938 in Saint Briac, France, where he was taking a course in the sculpture of ship models and she was training as a nurse. They married on February 8, 1941, in Montgomery, Alabama, while he was a Cadet in the Army Air Corps. They had four children: Margaret (born 1941); John (born 1943); Diana (born 1947); and Cameron (born 1950).

In retirement, Kerry engaged in his passion for sailing. He made several Atlantic crossings. Kerry sailed the New England and Nova Scotia coasts solo and raced sloops.

Kerry died in at Massachusetts General Hospital on July 29, 2000 from prostate cancer complications, one day after his 85th birthday.

Kerry's son, John Kerry, has said that although he knew his paternal grandfather had come from Austria, he did not know until informed by The Boston Globe in January 2003 that Fred Kerry had changed his name from "Fritz Kohn" and converted from Judaism to Catholicism or that Ida Kerry's brother Otto and sister Jenni had died in Nazi concentration camps.
