= Battle of Kara Killisse (1915) =

Battle in 1915 during the First World War

- Part of Caucasus campaign
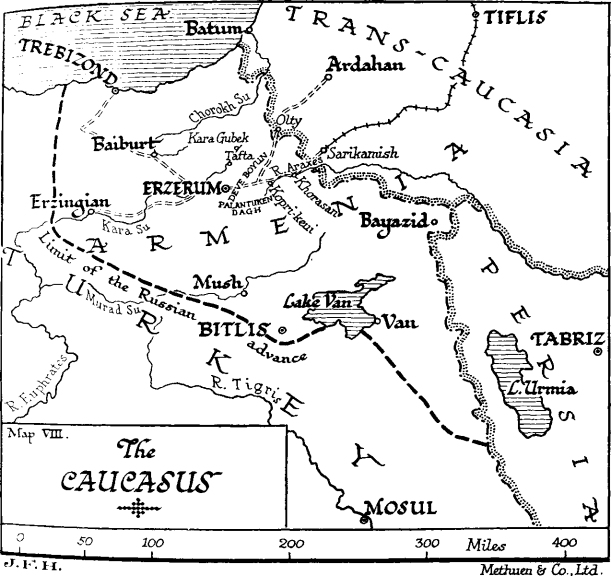
- Caucasus Front 1916
Date	27–31 July 1915
Location	Kara Killisse, Erzurum Vilayet, Ottoman Empire
Result	Russian victory

Belligerents
Russian Empire	Ottoman Empire

Commanders and leaders
Nikolai Yudenich	Abdul Kerim Pasha

Units involved
Russian Caucasus Army	Third Army

Strength
40,000	60,000

Casualties and losses
Unknown	16,000–20,000 (Note: 10,000 killed and wounded, 6,000-10,000 captured); 12 guns

The Battle of Kara Killisse (Lit. Black church, Turkish: Karakilise Muharebesi), also known as the Battle of Malazgirt, was fought on the Caucasus front in July 1915 after the Battle of Manzikert. In Russian historical literature, this engagement is considered as a part of "Alashkert defensive operation" (9 July – 3 August). Previously in the summer of 1915 the Russians attacked Turkish positions northeast of lake Van but they underestimated the size of their enemy. They were defeated at the Battle of Manzikert. This success encouraged the Turks under Abdul Kerim Pasha to advance towards the Russians in the Eleşkirt valley while the Turks were pursuing the remnants of Oganovki's army across the Ağrı mountains they spread out and Russian general Yudenich took the opportunity to counterattack from the west with some 20,000 reinforcements, which were mostly Cossack units, to encircle them. In the following battles between 5–8 August the Turks retreated south, but the Russians only partially succeeded. The Turks lost some guns, a large amount of provisions and 10,000 killed and wounded, while 6,000–10,000 became prisoners. Due to difficulties the Russians could not gain total advantage and retreated from the town of Van, and the Turks occupied it on 3 August.

== Effect on Russian morale ==
While the battle was indecisive, and the ground situation changed little, the Russians perceived the battle as a victory, and it boosted national Russian morale. This minor victory provided some respite to the continuing losses on the Eastern Front.
