= Bureau for United Nations Affairs =

The Bureau for United Nations Affairs is a former name of the Bureau of International Organization Affairs, a division of the United States Department of State. The Bureau was established on June 24, 1949, but its name was changed to the Bureau for United Nations Affairs four months later. In 1954 the bureau's name was changed back to the Bureau of International Organization Affairs. Richard J. Kerry, the father of US Senator John Kerry, worked for the bureau. Today, the division of the State Department that handles relations with the United Nations is the Bureau of International Organization Affairs.
