= Pyotr Oganovsky =

Russian general and writer

Pyotr Ivanovich Oganovsky
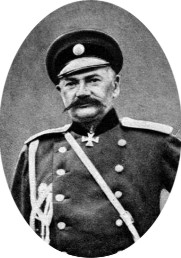
- Born: 26 August 1851
- Died: c. 1917
- Military career
- Allegiance: Russian Empire
- Branch: Imperial Russian Army
- Service years: 1867 – 1917
- Rank: General of the Infantry
- Conflicts: Russo-Turkish War; Russo-Japanese War; World War I; Battle of Manzikert; Defense of Van (1915)

Pyotr Ivanovich Oganovsky (Russian: Пётр Иванович Огановский; 26 August 1851 – c. 1917) was a Russian general of the infantry who participated in the Russo-Turkish War, Russo-Japanese War and the First World War. He was also a writer.

== Biography ==
Oganovsky was born on 26 August 1851 into an Orthodox Christian noble family. He graduated from the Nizhny Novgorod Cadet Corps. He entered the Russian Imperial Army on 9 August 1867 and in 1870 he graduated from the Vilnius Military School in the first category with the rank of praporshchik (ensign). He served in the 118th Shuisky Infantry Regiment. From 21 April 1871 he held the rank of podporuchik (second lieutenant), a poruchik (lieutenant) from 30 March 1874, and stabs-kapitan (staff captain) from 1 May 1877. In 1882 he graduated from the General Staff Academy.

From 22 May 1882 to 30 April 1885, Oganovsky was senior adjutant of the headquarters of the 16th Infantry Division. He was promoted to Captain on 8 April 1884. From 24 March 1885 to 15 November 1888, he was senior adjutant of the headquarters of the 8th Army Corps. From 4 October 1888 to 17 June 1895, he was a staff officer in the management of the head of the 10th local brigade and was promoted to lieutenant colonel with seniority on 4 September 1889. From 1 May to 1 September 1892, he served the qualifying command of a battalion in the 58th Prague Infantry Regiment and was promoted to colonel on 23 March 1893.

From 15 January 1896 to 1900, Oganovsky was chief of staff of the troops of Ural Oblast. From 2 September 1900 to 25 March 1904, he was commander of the 79th Kurinsky Infantry Regiment of the 20th Infantry Division. On 25 March 1904, he was promoted to Major General. Oganovsky then participated in the Russo-Japanese War. From 25 March 1904 to 23 March 1905, he was commander of the 2nd Brigade of the 2nd Siberian Infantry Division and from 23 March 1905 to 21 November 1906, was quartermaster general of the 1st Manchurian Army.

From 21 November 1906 to 18 April 1907, Oganovsky was chief of the 53rd infantry reserve brigade, and from 18 April 1907, chief of the 66th infantry reserve brigade. He also served as chief of the 52nd Infantry Brigade. On 18 April 1910, he was promoted to Lieutenant General and from 24 October 1910, he was the head of the 51st Infantry Division.

On 31 December 1913, Oganovsky was promoted to the rank of General of the Infantry with dismissal from service according to the age qualification. With the outbreak of the First World War, he was returned to service and assigned to the reserve ranks at the headquarters of the Kiev Military District. In 1914, he was commander of the 66th Infantry Division. On 24 January 1915 he was appointed commander of the 4th Caucasian Army Corps. On 19 December 1915, he was dismissed from office due to illness and was assigned to the reserve ranks at the headquarters of the Petrograd Military District. Commander of the 3rd Army Corps from 16 April 1916. Since 11 September of the same year, he was in the reserve of ranks at the headquarters of the Petrograd Military District. From September 1916 to 1917 he was in the reserve ranks of the headquarters of the Minsk Military District, from 17 June 1917 he was in the reserve ranks of the Caucasus Military District.

The further fate is unknown aside from his death date being somewhere around 1917.

=== Family ===
Oganovsky was married as of 1911.

- Father - John Lavrentievich Oganovsky
- Sisters - Sofia Ivanovna Oganovskaya and Lyubov Ivanovna Oganovskaya
- Son - Nikolai Petrovich Oganovsky (1874-1938) agricultural economist, statistician and politician.

=== Works ===
- A brief report on the activities of the Quartermaster General of the 1st Manchurian Army / Quartermaster General General-M. Oganovsky. - Moscow: Partnership "Printing S. P. Yakovlev", 1906. - 37 p .; 27 cm.
- Some instructions about the military operations of the troops, derived from the experience of the Russian-Japanese war. Elizavetpol : A. Gadzhi-Hasanov's typographic press, 1907 .-- 38 p.

=== Awards ===
- Order of St. Vladimir, II Class (6 December 1909);
- Order of St. Vladimir, III Class (1899);
- Order of St. Vladimir, IV Class (1896);
- Order of St. Alexander Nevsky with Swords (June 7, 1915);
- Order of the White Eagle (December 6, 1913) with swords (November 23, 1915);
- Order of St. Anna, 1st class with swords (1905);
- Order of St. Anna, II Class (1891);
- Order of St. Anna, III Class (1883);
- Order of St. Stanislaus, I Class (1904);
- Order of St. Stanislaus II degree (1887);
- Order of St. Stanislaus III degree (1878);
- Golden Weapon for Bravery (1905)
