= Battle of Manzikert (1915) =

Battle during the First World War

Coordinates: 39.1477°N 42.5441°E

- Part of the Caucasus campaign in the Middle Eastern Theatre (World War I)
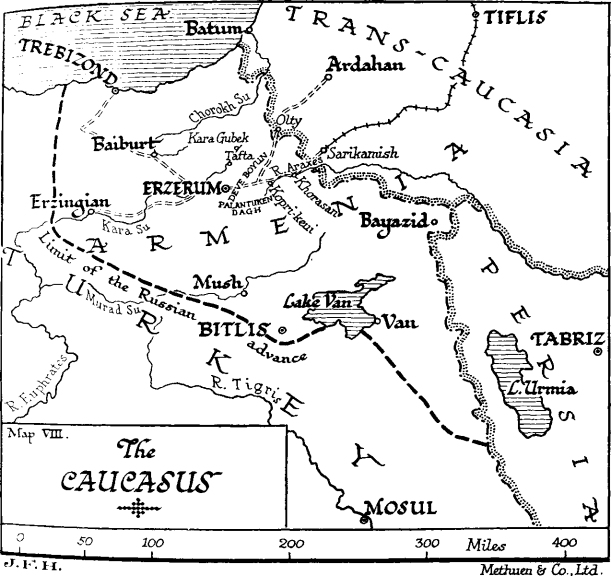
Date	July 10–26, 1915
Location	Malazgirt, Bitlis Vilayet, Ottoman Empire
Result	Ottoman victory

Belligerents
(Russia) Russian Empire	Ottoman Empire

Commanders and leaders
(Russia) Nikolai Yudenich (Russia) Pyotr Oganovsky	(Ottoman Empire) Abdul Kerim

Strength
22,000	Third Army; 40,000

Casualties and losses
7,000–10,000; 1,000 captured	6,000 captured

The Battle of Manzikert or Battle of Malazgirt (Russian: Битва при Манцикерте Bytva pri Mantsikerte; Turkish: Malazgirt Muharebesi) took place during the Caucasus Campaign of World War I, over the period July 10–26, 1915. Even though losses were heavy on both sides, the Russians retreated north and the Turks retook Malazgirt then they further advanced towards Karakilise where they were defeated on 5–8 August at the Battle of Kara Killisse.

== Background ==
At the beginning of May the Russians captured Tutak and on 17 May the town of Malazgirt was captured.

== Operations ==
On July 10, 1915, Russian General Oganovski launched an offensive to capture the hills just west of Malazgirt. He believed that the Turkish forces in the area were weak. However, the Turkish forces contained several divisions numbering upwards of 40,000 men. On July 16, the Ottoman Army counter-attacked under Abdul Kerim Pasha. They outnumbered the Russians by a factor of 3-1. Oganovski was forced to retreat back to Malazgirt, and in the process the Turks captured his baggage train. On July 20, the Turks retook Malazgirt and on 27 July also took Muş from the Russians. Due to the poor quality of the Russian communications, Yudenich, who was the Russian commander of the Caucasus front, did not learn that the Russian army was in retreat until July 22.

== Aftermath ==
The Russian army in Malazgirt was outnumbered 3-1 by the Ottoman army. Realizing that if the Ottomans attacked, his army would be destroyed, Yudenich ordered a retreat. The Russians retreated from Malazgirt, and the entire Van region as well. This left the city of Van open to an Ottoman attack, and the Ottomans captured the city on August 22. However, Malazgirt was re-captured by the Russians after the Ottomans were defeated at the Battle of Kara Killisse. Yudenich quickly regrouped his forces, fired Oganovski, and launched a counter-offensive. Russian casualties were reported to be about 10,000. Malazgirt was recaptured but Yudenich did not have a force large enough to exploit the situation further.

== Effects on morale ==
The morale of the Turkish leadership was lifted by the victory at Malazgirt and Abdul Kerim Pasha was encouraged by his success to follow the Russians. However, in the following battle of Karakilise in August the Turks were defeated and this in turn raised Russian morale.
