= Cameron Kerry =

American politician

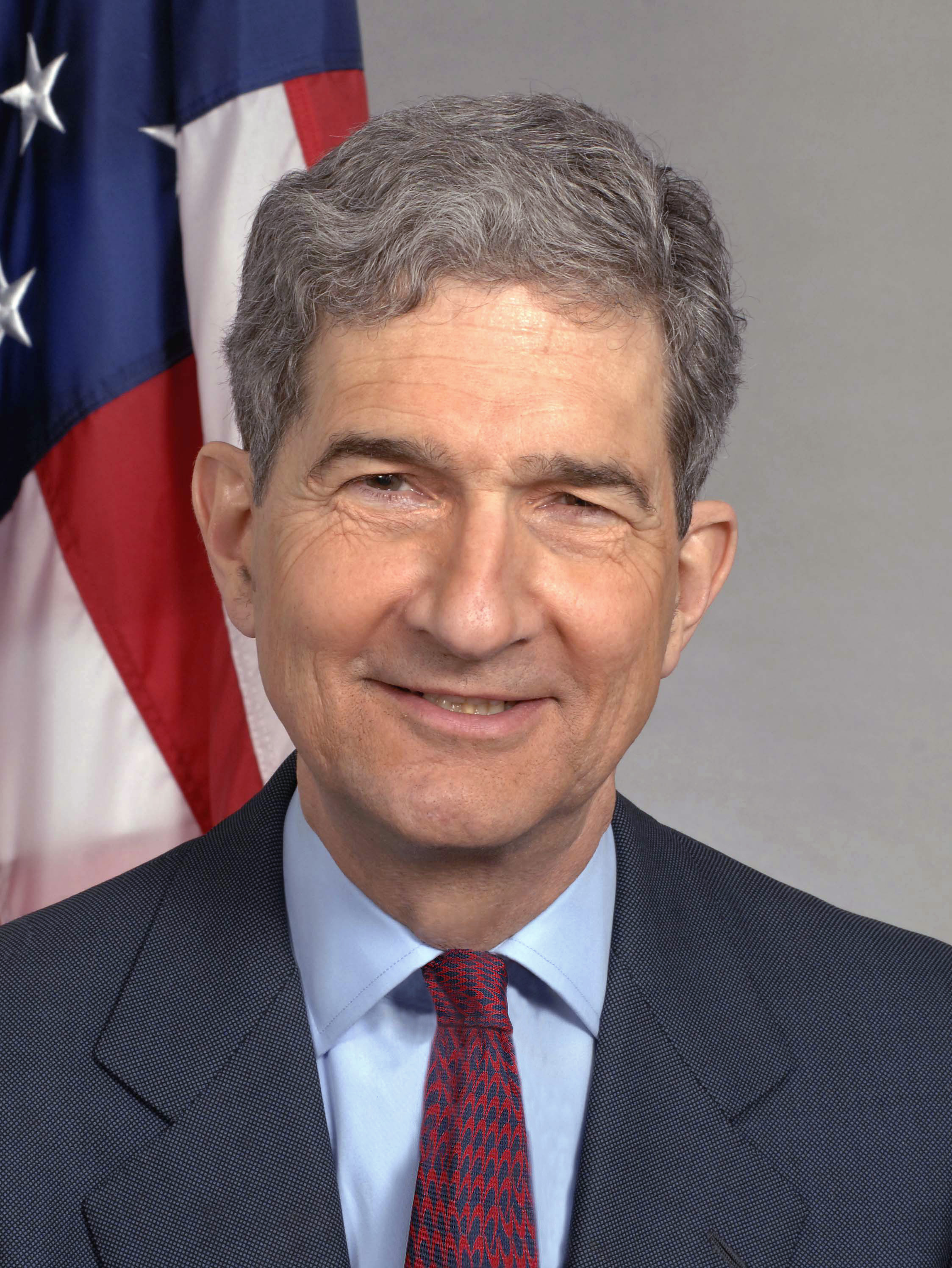

Acting United States Secretary of Commerce
- In office June 1, 2013 – June 26, 2013
- President: Barack Obama
- Deputy: Patrick D. Gallagher (acting)
- Preceded by: Rebecca Blank (acting)
- Succeeded by: Penny Pritzker

General Counsel of the United States Department of Commerce
- In office May 21, 2009 – September 4, 2013
- President: Barack Obama
- Preceded by: Lily Fu Claffee
- Succeeded by: Kelly R. Welsh

Personal details
- Born: Cameron Forbes Kerry; September 6, 1950 (age 76) Washington, D.C., U.S.
- Party: Democratic
- Spouse: Kathy Weinman
- Relations: See Forbes family
- Children: 2
- Parent(s): Richard Kerry; Rosemary Forbes
- Education: Harvard University (AB); Boston College (JD)
- Profession: Attorney and policy researcher

Cameron Forbes Kerry (born September 6, 1950) is an American attorney and policy researcher known for his work on privacy, cross-border data flows, and artificial intelligence governance. He is a distinguished visiting fellow at the Brookings Institution. He previously served as general counsel and acting Secretary of the U.S. Department of Commerce.

== Early life and education ==
Cameron Forbes Kerry was born in Washington, D.C. He is the fourth child of U.S. diplomat Richard Kerry and Rosemary Forbes of the Forbes family. He is the younger brother of John Kerry. Cameron Kerry graduated from Harvard College in 1972 and Boston College Law School in 1978.

== Career ==
=== Early legal and private sector career ===
After law school, Kerry served as law clerk to U.S. Senior Circuit Judge Elbert Tuttle from 1978 to 1979. He then joined Wilmer Cutler Pickering Hale and Dorr in Washington, D.C as an associate, before moving to Mintz, Levin, Cohn, Ferris, Glovsky, and Popeo in Boston, where he became an associate and partner. He was an adjunct professor of Telecommunications Law at Suffolk University Law School from 1997 to 2002.

=== Service in the Obama Administration ===
On April 20, 2009, President Obama nominated Kerry, and on May 21, 2009, he was confirmed unanimously by the United States Senate as the General Counsel of the U.S. Department of Commerce. In this role, Kerry was the principal legal advisor to the Secretary of Commerce and third-ranking secretarial officer. He served as the department's chief legal officer and oversaw the work of over 325 lawyers in 14 offices. Kerry also served as the department's chief ethics officer and co-chaired the secretary's Internet Policy Task Force.

Kerry was appointed acting United States Secretary of Commerce on June 1, 2013, and resumed his position as general counsel on June 26, 2013, when Penny Pritzker was sworn in as the 38th Secretary of Commerce. As the General Counsel of the Department of Commerce, Kerry was the principal legal advisor to the Secretary of Commerce and third-ranking secretarial officer. He resigned his position on September 4, 2013.

=== Brookings Institution and AI governance ===
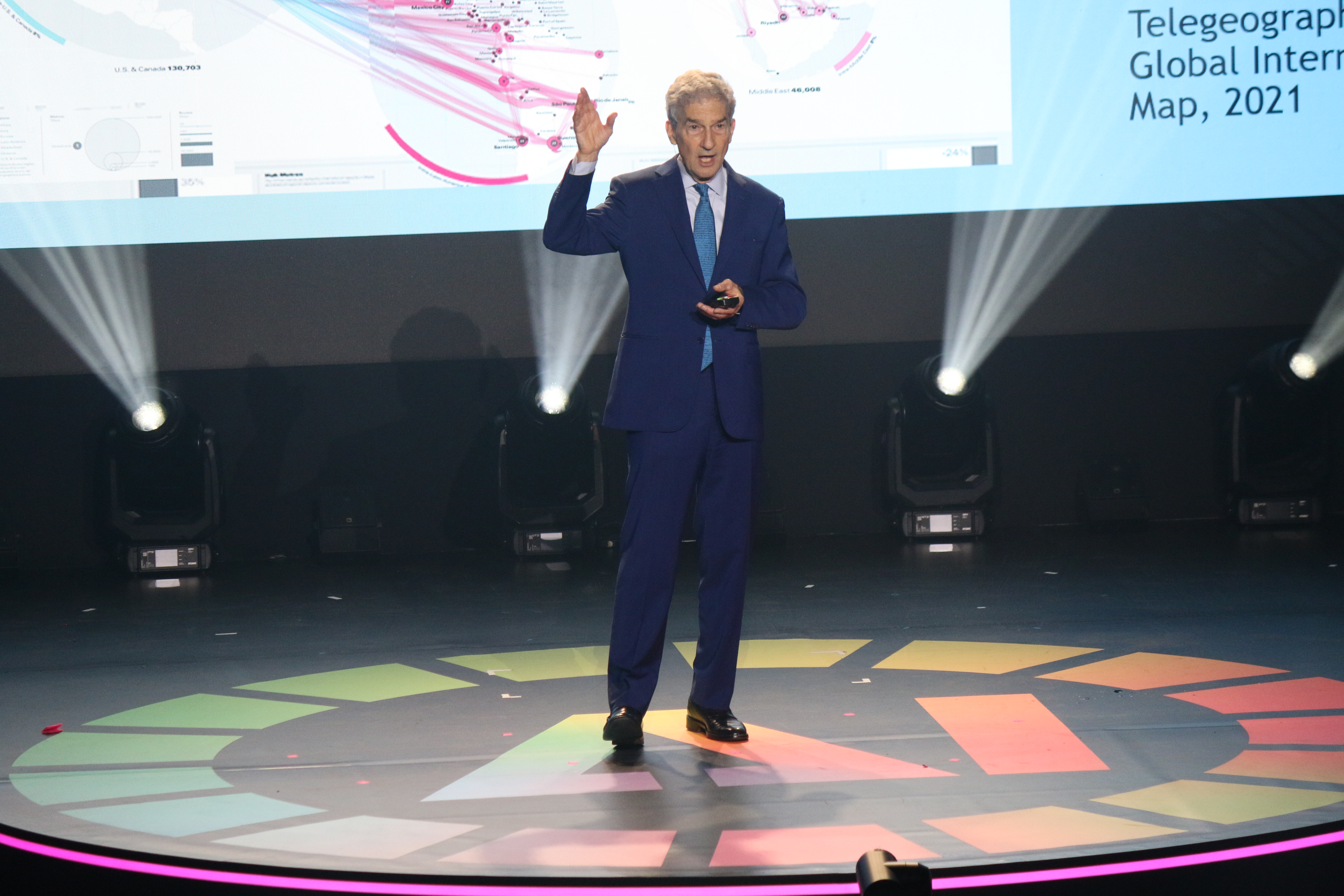
Kerry at the 2025 AI for Good Summit in Geneva

In December 2013, Kerry joined the Governance Studies program and the Center for Technology Innovation as the first Ann R. & Andrew H. Tisch Distinguished Visiting Fellow with the Brookings Institution.

At Brookings, Kerry leads two efforts: The Privacy Debate, a convening and publications series on U.S. privacy legislation, and The Forum for Cooperation on AI (FCAI), a series of roundtables seeking to identify avenues of cooperation on international AI regulation, standards, and research and development.

Kerry co-founded and helps lead FCAI, a collaboration between Brookings and the Centre for European Policy Studies.

In 2024, Kerry's report entitled Small yards, big tents: How to build cooperation on critical international standards drew coverage from the American National Standards Institute and policy media for recommending stronger U.S. and allied engagement in international standards bodies. In 2025, an essay co‑authored by Kerry argued for a distributed, networked approach to global AI governance and standards and was cited in independent outlets.

From 2014 to 2019, Kerry served as senior counsel with Sidley Austin.

Kerry has served on the board of the National Archives Foundation since 2018.

=== Political involvement ===
Kerry has worked on several of his brother John Kerry's political campaigns. In 1972, he served as strategy director for his brother's congressional campaign. In 1982, he served as campaign director for his brother's campaign for Lieutenant Governor.

During John's 2004 presidential campaign, Kerry traveled across the United States to discuss his brother's views on Israel, campaigning with Harvard Law School professor Alan Dershowitz, writer-comedian Larry David, and Jewish elected officials. According to contemporary news reports, Kerry also served as an advisor and campaign surrogate.

In 2006, Kerry was reported to have considered a run for Secretary of the Commonwealth of Massachusetts, but he declined after the Democratic incumbent William F. Galvin announced that he would seek re-election.

During the 2008 presidential campaign, Kerry served as the vice chair of the National Jewish Democratic Council and defended Democratic nominee Barack Obama in the Jewish press.

== Personal life ==
Kerry is married to Kathy Weinman; they have two daughters. He converted from Roman Catholicism to Judaism in 1983 before marrying Weinman. Kerry's paternal grandparents were Jews émigrés of Austrian-Jewish origins who converted to Catholicism.

Political offices
Preceded by Rebecca Blank; Acting	United States Secretary of Commerce; Acting; 2013	Succeeded by Penny Pritzker
